Theodore  Roosevelt Jr. (October 27, 1858 – January 6, 1919), often referred to as Teddy or by his initials, T. R., was an American politician, statesman, soldier, conservationist, naturalist, historian, and writer who served as the 26th president of the United States from 1901 to 1909. He previously served as the 25th vice president  under President William McKinley from March to September 1901 and as the 33rd governor of New York from 1899 to 1900. Assuming the presidency after McKinley's assassination, Roosevelt emerged as a leader of the Republican Party and became a driving force for anti-trust and Progressive policies.

A sickly child with debilitating asthma, he overcame his health problems as he grew by embracing a strenuous lifestyle. Roosevelt integrated his exuberant personality and a vast range of interests and achievements into a "cowboy" persona defined by robust masculinity. He was home-schooled and began a lifelong naturalist avocation before attending Harvard College. His book The Naval War of 1812 (1882) established his reputation as a learned historian and popular writer. Upon entering politics, Roosevelt became the leader of the reform faction of Republicans in New York's state legislature. His first wife and mother died on the same night, devastating him psychologically. He recuperated by buying and operating a cattle ranch in the Dakotas. Roosevelt served as Assistant Secretary of the Navy under President McKinley, and in 1898 helped plan the highly successful naval war against Spain. He resigned to help form and lead the Rough Riders, a unit that fought the Spanish army in Cuba to great publicity. Returning a war hero, Roosevelt was elected governor of New York in 1898. The New York state party leadership disliked his ambitious agenda and convinced McKinley to choose him as his running mate in the 1900 election. Roosevelt campaigned vigorously and the McKinley–Roosevelt ticket won a landslide victory based on a platform of victory, peace, and prosperity.

Roosevelt assumed the presidency at age 42, and remains the youngest person to become president of the United States. As a leader of the progressive movement he championed his "Square Deal" domestic policies. It called for fairness for all citizens, breaking of bad trusts, regulation of railroads, and pure food and drugs. Roosevelt prioritized conservation and established national parks, forests, and monuments to preserve the nation's natural resources. In foreign policy, he focused on Central America, where he began construction of the Panama Canal. Roosevelt expanded the Navy and sent the Great White Fleet on a world tour to project American naval power. His successful efforts to broker the end of the Russo-Japanese War won him the 1906 Nobel Peace Prize. Roosevelt was elected to a full term in 1904 and promoted policies more to the left, despite growing opposition from Republican leaders. During his presidency, he groomed his close ally William Howard Taft to succeed him in the 1908 presidential election.

Roosevelt grew frustrated with Taft's conservatism and belatedly tried to win the 1912 Republican nomination for president. He failed, walked out, and founded the new Progressive Party. He ran in the 1912 presidential election and the split allowed the Democratic nominee Woodrow Wilson to win the election. Following the defeat, Roosevelt led a two-year expedition to the Amazon basin where he nearly died of tropical disease. During World War I, he criticized Wilson for keeping the country out of the war, and his offer to lead volunteers to France was rejected. Roosevelt considered running for president again in 1920, but his health continued to deteriorate and he died in 1919. Polls of historians and political scientists rank him as one of the greatest presidents in American history.

Early life and family
 
Theodore Roosevelt Jr. was born on October 27, 1858, at 28 East 20th Street in Manhattan, New York City. He was the second of four children born to socialite Martha Stewart Bulloch and businessman and philanthropist Theodore Roosevelt Sr. He had an older sister (Anna), a younger brother (Elliott) and a younger sister (Corinne). Elliott was later the father of Anna Eleanor Roosevelt who married Theodore's distant cousin, Franklin Delano Roosevelt. His paternal grandfather was of Dutch descent; his other ancestry included primarily Scottish and Scots-Irish, English and smaller amounts of German, Welsh, and French. Theodore Sr. was the fifth son of businessman Cornelius Van Schaack "C. V. S." Roosevelt and Margaret Barnhill as well as a brother of Robert Roosevelt and James A. Roosevelt. Theodore's fourth cousin, James Roosevelt I, who was also a businessman, was the father of President Franklin Delano Roosevelt. Martha was the younger daughter of Major James Stephens Bulloch and Martha P. "Patsy" Stewart. Through the Van Schaacks, Roosevelt was a descendant of the Schuyler family.

Roosevelt's youth was largely shaped by his poor health and debilitating asthma. He repeatedly experienced sudden nighttime asthma attacks that caused the experience of being smothered to death, which terrified both Theodore and his parents. Doctors had no cure. Nevertheless, he was energetic and mischievously inquisitive. His lifelong interest in zoology began at age seven when he saw a dead seal at a local market; after obtaining the seal's head, Roosevelt and two cousins formed what they called the "Roosevelt Museum of Natural History". Having learned the rudiments of taxidermy, he filled his makeshift museum with animals that he killed or caught; he then studied the animals and prepared them for exhibition. At age nine, he recorded his observation of insects in a paper entitled "The Natural History of Insects".

Roosevelt's father significantly influenced him. His father was a prominent leader in New York's cultural affairs; he helped to found the Metropolitan Museum of Art, and had been especially active in mobilizing support for the Union during the American Civil War, even though his in-laws included Confederate leaders. Roosevelt said, "My father, Theodore Roosevelt, was the best man I ever knew. He combined strength and courage with gentleness, tenderness, and great unselfishness. He would not tolerate in us children selfishness or cruelty, idleness, cowardice, or untruthfulness."

 Family trips abroad, including tours of Europe in 1869 and 1870, and Egypt in 1872, shaped his cosmopolitan perspective. Hiking with his family in the Alps in 1869, Roosevelt found that he could keep pace with his father. He had discovered the significant benefits of physical exertion to minimize his asthma and bolster his spirits. Roosevelt began a heavy regime of exercise. After being manhandled by two older boys on a camping trip, he found a boxing coach to teach him to fight and strengthen his body.

A 6-year-old Roosevelt witnessed the funeral procession of Abraham Lincoln from his grandfather Cornelius's mansion in Union Square, New York City, where he was photographed in the window along with his brother Elliott, as confirmed by his second wife, Edith, who was also present.

Education
Roosevelt was homeschooled, mostly by tutors and his parents. Biographer H. W. Brands argued that "The most obvious drawback to his home schooling was uneven coverage of the various areas of human knowledge." He was solid in geography and bright in history, biology, French, and German; however, he struggled in mathematics and the classical languages. When he entered Harvard College on September 27, 1876, his father advised: "Take care of your morals first, your health next, and finally your studies." His father's sudden death on February 9, 1878, devastated Roosevelt, but he eventually recovered and doubled his activities. 

His father, a devout Presbyterian, regularly led the family in prayers. While at Harvard, young Theodore emulated him by teaching Sunday School for more than three years at Christ Church in Cambridge. When the minister at Christ Church, which was an Episcopal church, eventually insisted he become an Episcopalian to continue teaching in the Sunday School, Roosevelt declined, and instead began teaching a mission class in a poor section of Cambridge.

He did well in science, philosophy, and rhetoric courses but continued to struggle in Latin and Greek. He studied biology intently and was already an accomplished naturalist and a published ornithologist. He read prodigiously with an almost photographic memory. While at Harvard, Roosevelt participated in rowing and boxing; he was once runner-up in an intramural boxing tournament. Roosevelt was a member of the Alpha Delta Phi literary society (later the Fly Club), the Delta Kappa Epsilon fraternity, and the prestigious Porcellian Club; he was also an editor of The Harvard Advocate. In 1880, Roosevelt graduated Phi Beta Kappa (22nd of 177) from Harvard with an A.B. magna cum laude. Biographer Henry F. Pringle states:

After his father's death, Roosevelt had inherited $65,000, enough wealth on which he could live comfortably for the rest of his life. Roosevelt gave up his earlier plan of studying natural science and decided to attend Columbia Law School instead, moving back into his family's home in New York City. Although Roosevelt was an able law student, he often found law to be irrational. He spent much of his time writing a book on the War of 1812.

Determined to enter politics, Roosevelt began attending meetings at Morton Hall, the 59th Street headquarters of New York's 21st District Republican Association. Though Roosevelt's father had been a prominent member of the Republican Party, the younger Roosevelt made an unorthodox career choice for someone of his class, as most of Roosevelt's peers refrained from becoming too closely involved in politics. Roosevelt found allies in the local Republican Party and defeated an incumbent Republican state assemblyman tied to the political machine of Senator Roscoe Conkling closely. After his election victory, Roosevelt decided to drop out of law school, later saying, "I intended to be one of the governing class."

Naval history and strategy
While at Harvard, Roosevelt began a systematic study of the role played by the United States Navy in the War of 1812. Assisted by two uncles, he scrutinized original source materials and official U.S. Navy records, ultimately publishing The Naval War of 1812 in 1882. The book contained drawings of individual and combined ship maneuvers, charts depicting the differences in iron throw weights of cannon shot between rival forces, and analyses of the differences and similarities between British and American leadership down to the ship-to-ship level. Upon release, The Naval War of 1812 was praised for its scholarship and style and it remains a standard study of the war.

With the publication of The Influence of Sea Power upon History in 1890, Navy Captain Alfred Thayer Mahan was hailed as the world's outstanding naval theorist by the leaders of Europe immediately. Roosevelt paid very close attention to Mahan's emphasis that only a nation with the world's most powerful fleet could dominate the world's oceans, exert its diplomacy to the fullest, and defend its own borders. He incorporated Mahan's ideas into his views on naval strategy for the remainder of his career.

First marriage and widowerhood 
In 1880, Roosevelt married socialite Alice Hathaway Lee. Their daughter, Alice Lee Roosevelt, was born on February 12, 1884. Two days later, the new mother died of undiagnosed kidney failure that the pregnancy masked. In his diary, Roosevelt wrote a large "X" on the page and then, "The light has gone out of my life." His mother, Martha, had died of typhoid fever eleven hours earlier at 3:00 a.m., in the same house on 57th Street in Manhattan. Distraught, Roosevelt left baby Alice in the care of his sister Bamie while he grieved; he assumed custody of Alice when she was three.

After the deaths of his wife and mother, Roosevelt focused on his work, specifically by re-energizing a legislative investigation into corruption of the New York City government, which arose from a concurrent bill proposing that power be centralized in the mayor's office. For the rest of his life, he rarely spoke about his wife Alice and did not write about her in his autobiography.

Early political career

State Assemblyman

Roosevelt was a member of the New York State Assembly (New York Co., 21st D.) in 1882, 1883, and 1884. He began making his mark immediately and in handling in corporate corruption issues specifically. He blocked a corrupt effort of financier Jay Gould to lower his taxes. Roosevelt also exposed the suspected collusion of Gould and Judge Theodore Westbrook and argued for and received approval for an investigation to proceed, aiming for the judge to be impeached. Although the investigation committee rejected the proposed impeachment, Roosevelt had exposed the potential corruption in Albany and assumed a high and positive political profile in multiple New York publications.

Roosevelt's anti-corruption efforts helped him win re-election in 1882 by a margin greater than two-to-one, an achievement made even more impressive by the victory that Democratic gubernatorial candidate Grover Cleveland won in Roosevelt's district. With Conkling's Stalwart faction of the Republican Party in disarray following the assassination of President James Garfield, Roosevelt won election as the Republican party leader in the state assembly. He allied with Governor Cleveland to win passage of a civil service reform bill. Roosevelt won re-election a second time and sought the office of Speaker of the New York State Assembly, but Titus Sheard obtained the position in a 41 to 29 vote of the GOP caucus instead. In his final term, Roosevelt served as Chairman of the Committee on Affairs of Cities, during which he wrote more bills than any other legislator.

Presidential election of 1884

With numerous presidential hopefuls from whom to choose, Roosevelt supported Senator George F. Edmunds of Vermont, a colorless reformer. The state GOP preferred the incumbent president, New York City's Chester Arthur, known for passing the Pendleton Civil Service Reform Act.  Roosevelt fought for and succeeded in influencing the Manhattan delegates at the state convention in Utica. He then took control of the state convention, bargaining through the night and outmaneuvering the supporters of Arthur and James G. Blaine; consequently, he gained a national reputation as a key politician in his state.

Roosevelt attended the 1884 GOP National Convention in Chicago and gave a speech convincing delegates to nominate African American John R. Lynch, an Edmunds supporter, to be the temporary chair. Roosevelt fought alongside the Mugwump reformers against Blaine. However Blaine gained support from Arthur's and Edmunds's delegates, and won the nomination on the fourth ballot. In a crucial moment of his budding political career, Roosevelt resisted the demand of his fellow Mugwumps that he bolt from Blaine. He bragged about his one small success: "We achieved a victory in getting up a combination to beat the Blaine nominee for temporary chairman... To do this needed a mixture of skill, boldness and energy... to get the different factions to come in... to defeat the common foe." He was also impressed by an invitation to speak before an audience of ten thousand, the largest crowd he had addressed up to that date. Having gotten a taste of national politics, Roosevelt felt less aspiration for advocacy on the state level; he then retired to his new "Chimney Butte Ranch" on the Little Missouri River. Roosevelt refused to join other Mugwumps in supporting Grover Cleveland, the governor of New York and the Democratic nominee in the general election. He debated the pros and cons of staying loyal with his political friend, Henry Cabot Lodge. After Blaine won the nomination, Roosevelt had said carelessly that he would give "hearty support to any decent Democrat". He distanced himself from the promise, saying that it had not been meant "for publication". When a reporter asked if he would support Blaine, Roosevelt replied, "That question I decline to answer. It is a subject I do not care to talk about." In the end, he realized that he had to support Blaine to maintain his role in the GOP and he did so in a press release on July 19. Having lost the support of many reformers, Roosevelt decided to retire from politics and move to North Dakota.

Cattle rancher in Dakota

Roosevelt first visited the Dakota Territory in 1883 to hunt bison. Exhilarated by the western lifestyle and with the cattle business booming in the territory, Roosevelt invested $14,000 in hopes of becoming a prosperous cattle rancher. For the next several years, he shuttled between his home in New York and his ranch in Dakota.

Roosevelt learned to ride western style, rope, and hunt on the banks of the Little Missouri. Though he earned the respect of the authentic cowboys, they were not overly impressed. However, he identified with the herdsman of history, a man he said possesses "few of the emasculated, milk-and-water moralities admired by the pseudo-philanthropists; but he does possess, to a very high degree, the stern, manly qualities that are invaluable to a nation". He reoriented and began writing about frontier life for national magazines; he also published three books: Hunting Trips of a Ranchman, Ranch Life and the Hunting-Trail, and The Wilderness Hunter.

Roosevelt successfully led efforts to organize ranchers there to address the problems of overgrazing and other shared concerns, which resulted in the formation of the Little Missouri Stockmen's Association. He felt compelled to promote conservation and was able to form the Boone and Crockett Club, whose primary goal was the conservation of large game animals and their habitats. In 1886, Roosevelt served as a deputy sheriff in Billings County, North Dakota. During this time he and two ranch hands hunted down three boat thieves.

The uniquely severe U.S. winter of 1886–1887 wiped out his herd of cattle and those of his competitors and over half of his $80,000 investment.  He ended his ranching life and returned to New York, where he escaped the damaging label of an ineffectual intellectual.

Second marriage
On December 2, 1886, Roosevelt married his childhood friend, Edith Kermit Carow. Roosevelt felt deeply troubled that his second marriage had taken place very quickly after the death of his first wife and he also faced resistance from his sisters. Nonetheless, the couple married at St George's, Hanover Square, in London, England. The couple had five children: Theodore "Ted" III in 1887, Kermit in 1889, Ethel in 1891, Archibald in 1894, and Quentin in 1897. They also raised Roosevelt's daughter from his first marriage,  Alice, who often clashed with her stepmother.

Reentering public life
Upon Roosevelt's return to New York in 1886, Republican leaders quickly approached him about running for mayor of New York City in the  1886 election.  Roosevelt accepted the nomination despite having little hope of winning the race against United Labor Party candidate Henry George and Democratic candidate Abram Hewitt.  Roosevelt campaigned hard for the position, but Hewitt won with 41% (90,552 votes), taking the votes of many Republicans who feared George's radical policies. George was held to 31% (68,110 votes), and Roosevelt took third place with 27% (60,435 votes). Fearing that his political career might never recover, Roosevelt turned his attention to writing The Winning of the West, a historical work tracking the westward movement of Americans; the book was a great success for Roosevelt, earning favorable reviews and selling numerous copies.

Civil Service Commission
After Benjamin Harrison unexpectedly defeated Blaine for the presidential nomination at the 1888 Republican National Convention, Roosevelt gave stump speeches in the Midwest in support of Harrison. On the insistence of Henry Cabot Lodge, President Harrison appointed Roosevelt to the United States Civil Service Commission, where he served until 1895. While many of his predecessors had approached the office as a sinecure, Roosevelt vigorously fought the spoilsmen and demanded enforcement of civil service laws.  The Sun then described Roosevelt as "irrepressible, belligerent, and enthusiastic". Roosevelt frequently clashed with Postmaster General John Wanamaker, who handed out numerous patronage positions to Harrison supporters, and Roosevelt's attempt to force out several postal workers damaged Harrison politically. Despite Roosevelt's support for Harrison's reelection bid in the presidential election of 1892, the eventual winner, Grover Cleveland, reappointed him to the same post. Roosevelt's close friend and biographer, Joseph Bucklin Bishop, described his assault on the spoils system:

New York City Police Commissioner
In 1894, a group of reform Republicans approached Roosevelt about running for Mayor of New York again; he declined, mostly due to his wife's resistance to being removed from the Washington social set. Soon after he declined, he realized that he had missed an opportunity to reinvigorate a dormant political career. He retreated to the Dakotas for a time; his wife Edith regretted her role in the decision and vowed that there would be no repeat of it.

William Lafayette Strong, a reform-minded Republican, won the 1894 mayoral election and offered Roosevelt a position on the board of the New York City Police Commissioners. Roosevelt became president of the board of commissioners and radically reformed the police force. Roosevelt implemented regular inspections of firearms and annual physical exams, appointed recruits based on their physical and mental qualifications rather than political affiliation, established Meritorious Service Medals, and closed corrupt police hostelries. During his tenure, a Municipal Lodging House was established by the Board of Charities, and Roosevelt required officers to register with the Board; he also had telephones installed in station houses.

In 1894, Roosevelt met Jacob Riis, the muckraking Evening Sun newspaper journalist who was opening the eyes of New Yorkers to the terrible conditions of the city's millions of poor immigrants with such books as How the Other Half Lives. Riis described how his book affected Roosevelt:

Roosevelt made a habit of walking officers' beats late at night and early in the morning to make sure that they were on duty. He made a concerted effort to uniformly enforce New York's Sunday closing law; in this, he ran up against boss Tom Platt as well as Tammany Hall—he was notified that the Police Commission was being legislated out of existence. His crackdowns led to protests and demonstrations. Invited to one large demonstration, not only did he surprisingly accept, he delighted in the insults, caricatures, and lampoons directed at him, and earned some surprising good will. Roosevelt chose to defer rather than split with his party. As Governor of New York State, he would later sign an act replacing the Police Commission with a single Police Commissioner.

Emergence as a national figure

Assistant Secretary of the Navy

In the 1896 presidential election, Roosevelt backed Speaker of the House Thomas Brackett Reed for the Republican nomination, but William McKinley won the nomination and defeated William Jennings Bryan in the general election. Roosevelt strongly opposed Bryan's free silver platform, viewing many of Bryan's followers as dangerous fanatics. He gave scores of campaign speeches for McKinley. Urged by Senator Henry Cabot Lodge, President McKinley appointed Roosevelt as the Assistant Secretary of the Navy in 1897. Secretary of the Navy John D. Long was more concerned about formalities than functions, was in poor health, and left many major decisions to Roosevelt. Influenced by Alfred Thayer Mahan, Roosevelt called for a build-up in the country's naval strength, particularly the construction of battleships. Roosevelt also began pressing his national security views regarding the Pacific and the Caribbean on McKinley, and was particularly adamant that Spain be ejected from Cuba. He explained his priorities to one of the Navy's planners in late 1897:

On February 15, 1898, an armored cruiser, exploded in the harbor of Havana, Cuba, killing hundreds of crew members. While Roosevelt and many other Americans blamed Spain for the explosion, McKinley sought a diplomatic solution. Without approval from Long or McKinley, Roosevelt sent out orders to several naval vessels, directing them to prepare for war. George Dewey, who had received an appointment to lead the Asiatic Squadron with the backing of Roosevelt, later credited his victory at the Battle of Manila Bay to Roosevelt's orders. After finally giving up hope of a peaceful solution, McKinley asked Congress to declare war upon Spain, beginning the Spanish–American War.

War in Cuba

With the beginning of the Spanish–American War in late April 1898, Roosevelt resigned from his post as Assistant Secretary of the Navy. Along with Army Colonel Leonard Wood, he formed the First U.S. Volunteer Cavalry Regiment. His wife and many of his friends begged Roosevelt to remain in his post in Washington, but Roosevelt was determined to see battle. When the newspapers reported the formation of the new regiment, Roosevelt and Wood were flooded with applications from all over the country. Referred to by the press as the "Rough Riders", the regiment was one of many temporary units active only for the duration of the war.

The regiment trained for several weeks in San Antonio, Texas, and in his autobiography, Roosevelt wrote that his prior experience with the New York National Guard had been invaluable, in that it enabled him to immediately begin teaching his men basic soldiering skills. The Rough Riders used some standard issue gear and some of their own design, purchased with gift money. Diversity characterized the regiment, which included Ivy Leaguers, professional and amateur athletes, upscale gentlemen, cowboys, frontiersmen, Native Americans, hunters, miners, prospectors, former soldiers, tradesmen, and sheriffs. The Rough Riders were part of the cavalry division commanded by former Confederate general Joseph Wheeler, which itself was one of three divisions in the V Corps under Lieutenant General William Rufus Shafter. Roosevelt and his men landed in Daiquirí, Cuba, on June 23, 1898, and marched to Siboney. Wheeler sent parts of the 1st and 10th Regular Cavalry on the lower road northwest and sent the "Rough Riders" on the parallel road running along a ridge up from the beach. To throw off his infantry rival, Wheeler left one regiment of his Cavalry Division, the 9th, at Siboney so that he could claim that his move north was only a limited reconnaissance if things went wrong. Roosevelt was promoted to colonel and took command of the regiment when Wood was put in command of the brigade. The Rough Riders had a short, minor skirmish known as the Battle of Las Guasimas; they fought their way through Spanish resistance and, together with the Regulars, forced the Spaniards to abandon their positions.

Under Roosevelt's leadership, the Rough Riders became famous for the charge up Kettle Hill on July 1, 1898, while supporting the regulars. Roosevelt had the only horse, and rode back and forth between rifle pits at the forefront of the advance up Kettle Hill, an advance that he urged despite the absence of any orders from superiors. He was forced to walk up the last part of Kettle Hill because his horse had been entangled in barbed wire. The victories came at a cost of 200 killed and 1,000 wounded.

In August, Roosevelt and other officers demanded that the soldiers be returned home. Roosevelt always recalled the Battle of Kettle Hill (part of the San Juan Heights) as "the great day of my life" and "my crowded hour". In 2001, Roosevelt was posthumously awarded the Medal of Honor for his actions; he had been nominated during the war, but Army officials, annoyed at his grabbing the headlines, blocked it. After returning to civilian life, Roosevelt preferred to be known as "Colonel Roosevelt" or "The Colonel", though "Teddy" remained much more popular with the public, even though Roosevelt openly despised that moniker. Men working closely with Roosevelt customarily called him "Colonel" or "Theodore". Henceforth, political cartoons of Roosevelt usually depicted him in his Rough Rider garb.

Governor of New York
After leaving Cuba in August 1898, the Rough Riders were transported to a camp at Montauk Point, Long Island, where Roosevelt and his men were briefly quarantined due to the War Department's fear of spreading yellow fever. Shortly after Roosevelt's return to the United States, Republican Congressman Lemuel E. Quigg, a lieutenant of party boss Tom Platt, asked Roosevelt to run in the 1898 gubernatorial election. Prospering politically from the Platt machine, Roosevelt's gradual rise to power was marked by the pragmatic decisions of New York machine boss T. C. "Tom" Platt, who served as a U.S. senator from the state. The demonstrated willingness of Platt to compromise with the GOP progressive wing led by Roosevelt and Benjamin B. Odell, Jr., resulted, over time, in their growth of political strength at the expense of the "easy boss," whose machine faced collapse in 1903 at the hands of Odell.
Platt disliked Roosevelt personally, feared that Roosevelt would oppose Platt's interests in office, and was reluctant to propel Roosevelt to the forefront of national politics. However, Platt also needed a strong candidate due to the unpopularity of the incumbent Republican governor, Frank S. Black. Roosevelt agreed to become the nominee and to try not to "make war" with the Republican establishment once in office. Roosevelt defeated Black in the Republican caucus by a vote of 753 to 218, and faced Democrat Augustus Van Wyck, a well-respected judge, in the general election. Roosevelt campaigned vigorously on his war record, winning the election by a margin of just one percent.

As governor, Roosevelt learned much about ongoing economic issues and political techniques that later proved valuable in his presidency. He studied the problems of trusts, monopolies, labor relations, and conservation. Chessman argues that Roosevelt's program "rested firmly upon the concept of the square deal by a neutral state". The rules for the Square Deal were "honesty in public affairs, an equitable sharing of privilege and responsibility, and subordination of party and local concerns to the interests of the state at large".

By holding twice-daily press conferences—which was an innovation—Roosevelt remained connected with his middle-class political base. Roosevelt successfully pushed the Ford Franchise-Tax bill, which taxed public franchises granted by the state and controlled by corporations, declaring that "a corporation which derives its powers from the State, should pay to the State a just percentage of its earnings as a return for the privileges it enjoys". He rejected "boss" Thomas C. Platt's worries that this approached Bryanite Socialism, explaining that without it, New York voters might get angry and adopt public ownership of streetcar lines and other franchises.

The New York state government affected many interests, and the power to make appointments to policy-making positions was a key role for the governor. Platt insisted that he be consulted on major appointments; Roosevelt appeared to comply, but then made his own decisions. Historians marvel that Roosevelt managed to appoint so many first-rate men with Platt's approval. He even enlisted Platt's help in securing reform, such as in the spring of 1899, when Platt pressured state senators to vote for a civil service bill that the secretary of the Civil Service Reform Association called "superior to any civil service statute heretofore secured in America".

G. Wallace Chessman argues that as governor, Roosevelt developed the principles that shaped his presidency, especially insistence upon the public responsibility of large corporations, publicity as a first remedy for trusts, regulation of railroad rates, mediation of the conflict of capital and labor, conservation of natural resources and protection of the less fortunate members of society. Roosevelt sought to position himself against the excesses of large corporations on the one hand and radical movements on the other.

As the chief executive of the most populous state in the union, Roosevelt was widely considered a potential future presidential candidate, and supporters such as William Allen White encouraged him to run for president. Roosevelt had no interest in challenging McKinley for the Republican nomination in 1900, and was denied his preferred post of Secretary of War. As his term progressed, Roosevelt pondered a 1904 presidential run, but was uncertain about whether he should seek re-election as governor in 1900.

Vice presidency (1901)

In November 1899, Vice President Garret Hobart died of heart failure, leaving an open spot on the 1900 Republican national ticket. Though Henry Cabot Lodge and others urged him to run for vice president in 1900, Roosevelt was reluctant to take the powerless position and issued a public statement saying that he would not accept the nomination. Additionally, Roosevelt was informed by President McKinley and campaign manager Mark Hanna that he was not being considered for the role of vice president due to his actions prior to the Spanish–American War. Eager to be rid of Roosevelt, Platt nonetheless began a newspaper campaign in favor of Roosevelt's nomination for the vice presidency. Roosevelt attended the 1900 Republican National Convention as a state delegate and struck a bargain with Platt: Roosevelt would accept the nomination for vice president if the convention offered it to him, but would otherwise serve another term as governor. Platt asked Pennsylvania party boss Matthew Quay to lead the campaign for Roosevelt's nomination, and Quay outmaneuvered Hanna at the convention to put Roosevelt on the ticket. Roosevelt won the nomination unanimously.

Roosevelt's vice-presidential campaigning proved highly energetic and an equal match for Democratic presidential nominee William Jennings Bryan's famous barnstorming style of campaigning. In a whirlwind campaign that displayed his energy to the public, Roosevelt made 480 stops in 23 states. He denounced the radicalism of Bryan, contrasting it with the heroism of the soldiers and sailors who fought and won the war against Spain. Bryan had strongly supported the war itself, but he denounced the annexation of the Philippines as imperialism, which would spoil America's innocence. Roosevelt countered that it was best for the Filipinos to have stability and the Americans to have a proud place in the world. With the nation basking in peace and prosperity, the voters gave McKinley an even larger victory than that which he had achieved in 1896.

After the campaign, Roosevelt took office as vice president in March 1901. The office of vice president was a powerless sinecure and did not suit Roosevelt's aggressive temperament. Roosevelt's six months as vice president were uneventful and boring for a man of action. He had no power; he presided over the Senate for a mere four days before it adjourned. On September 2, 1901, Roosevelt first publicized an aphorism that thrilled his supporters: "Speak softly and carry a big stick, and you will go far."

Presidency (1901–1909)

On September 6, 1901, President McKinley was attending the Pan-American Exposition in Buffalo, New York when he was shot by anarchist Leon Czolgosz. Roosevelt was vacationing in Isle La Motte, Vermont, and traveled to Buffalo to visit McKinley in the hospital. It appeared that McKinley would recover, so Roosevelt resumed his vacation in the Adirondack Mountains. When McKinley's condition worsened, Roosevelt again rushed back to Buffalo. McKinley died on September 14, and Roosevelt was informed while he was in North Creek; he continued on to Buffalo and was sworn in as the nation's 26th president at the Ansley Wilcox House.

McKinley's supporters were nervous about the new president, and Ohio Senator Mark Hanna was particularly bitter that the man he had opposed so vigorously at the convention had succeeded McKinley. Roosevelt assured party leaders that he intended to adhere to McKinley's policies, and he retained McKinley's Cabinet. Nonetheless, Roosevelt sought to position himself as the party's undisputed leader, seeking to bolster the role of the president and position himself for the 1904 election.  The vice presidency remained vacant, as there was no constitutional provision for filling an intra-term vacancy in that office (prior to the 25th Amendment in 1967).

Shortly after taking office, Roosevelt invited Booker T. Washington to dinner at the White House. This sparked a bitter, and at times vicious, reaction among whites across the heavily segregated South. Roosevelt reacted with astonishment and protest, saying that he looked forward to many future dinners with Washington. Upon further reflection, Roosevelt wanted to ensure that this had no effect on political support in the white South, and further dinner invitations to Washington were avoided; their next meeting was scheduled as typical business at 10:00 a.m. instead.

Domestic policies: The Square Deal

Trust busting and regulation
For his aggressive use of the 1890 Sherman Antitrust Act, compared to his predecessors, Roosevelt was hailed  as the "trust-buster"; but in reality he was more of a trust regulator. Roosevelt viewed big business as a necessary part of the American economy, and sought only to prosecute the "bad trusts" that restrained trade and charged unfair prices. He brought 44 antitrust suits, breaking up the Northern Securities Company, the largest railroad monopoly; and regulating Standard Oil, the largest oil company. Presidents Benjamin Harrison, Grover Cleveland, and William McKinley combined had prosecuted only 18 antitrust violations under the Sherman Antitrust Act.

Bolstered by his party's winning large majorities in the 1902 elections, Roosevelt proposed the creation of the United States Department of Commerce and Labor, which would include the Bureau of Corporations. While Congress was receptive to the Department of Commerce and Labor, it was more skeptical of the antitrust powers that Roosevelt sought to endow within the Bureau of Corporations. Roosevelt successfully appealed to the public to pressure Congress, and Congress overwhelmingly voted to pass Roosevelt's version of the bill.

In a moment of frustration, House Speaker Joseph Gurney Cannon commented on Roosevelt's desire for executive branch control in domestic policy-making: "That fellow at the other end of the avenue wants everything from the birth of Christ to the death of the devil." Biographer Brands states, "Even his friends occasionally wondered whether there wasn't any custom or practice too minor for him to try to regulate, update or otherwise improve." In fact, Roosevelt's willingness to exercise his power included attempted rule changes in the game of football; at the U.S. Naval Academy, he sought to force retention of martial arts classes and to revise disciplinary rules. He even ordered changes made in the minting of a coin whose design he disliked, and ordered the Government Printing Office to adopt simplified spellings for a core list of 300 words, according to reformers on the Simplified Spelling Board. He was forced to rescind the latter after substantial ridicule from the press and a resolution of protest from the U.S. House of Representatives.

Coal strike

In May 1902, anthracite coal miners went on strike, threatening a national energy shortage. After threatening the coal operators with intervention by federal troops, Roosevelt won their agreement to dispute arbitration by a commission, which succeeded in stopping the strike. The accord with J. P. Morgan resulted in the miners getting more pay for fewer hours, but with no union recognition. Roosevelt said, "My action on labor should always be considered in connection with my action as regards capital, and both are reducible to my favorite formula—a square deal for every man." Roosevelt was the first president to help settle a labor dispute.

Prosecuted misconduct
During Roosevelt's second year in office it was discovered there was corruption in the Indian Service, the Land Office, and the Post Office Department. Roosevelt investigated and prosecuted corrupt Indian agents who had cheated the Creeks and various Native American tribes out of land parcels. Land fraud and speculation were found involving Oregon federal timberlands. In November 1902, Roosevelt and Secretary Ethan A. Hitchcock forced Binger Hermann, the General Land Office Commissioner, to resign from office. On November 6, 1903 Francis J. Heney was appointed special prosecutor and obtained 146 indictments involving an Oregon Land Office bribery ring. U.S. Senator John H. Mitchell was indicted for bribery to expedite illegal land patents, found guilty in July 1905, and sentenced to six months in prison. More corruption was found in the Postal Department, that brought on the indictments of 44 government employees on charges of bribery and fraud. Historians generally agree that Roosevelt moved "quickly and decisively" to prosecute misconduct in his administration.

Railroads

Merchants complained that some railroad rates were too high. In the 1906 Hepburn Act, Roosevelt sought to give the Interstate Commerce Commission the power to regulate rates, but the Senate, led by conservative Nelson Aldrich, fought back. Roosevelt worked with the Democratic Senator Benjamin Tillman to pass the bill. Roosevelt and Aldrich ultimately reached a compromise that gave the ICC the power to replace existing rates with "just-and-reasonable" maximum rates, but allowed railroads to appeal to the federal courts on what was "reasonable". In addition to rate-setting, the Hepburn Act also granted the ICC regulatory power over pipeline fees, storage contracts, and several other aspects of railroad operations.

Pure food and drugs
Roosevelt responded to public anger over the abuses in the food packing industry by pushing Congress to pass the Meat Inspection Act of 1906 and the Pure Food and Drug Act. Though conservatives initially opposed the bill, Upton Sinclair's The Jungle, published in 1906, helped galvanize support for reform. The Meat Inspection Act of 1906 banned misleading labels and preservatives that contained harmful chemicals. The Pure Food and Drug Act banned food and drugs that were impure or falsely labeled from being made, sold, and shipped. Roosevelt also served as honorary president of the American School Hygiene Association from 1907 to 1908, and in 1909 he convened the first White House Conference on the Care of Dependent Children.

Conservation

Of all Roosevelt's achievements, he was proudest of his work in the conservation of natural resources and extending federal protection to land and wildlife. Roosevelt worked closely with Interior Secretary James Rudolph Garfield and Chief of the United States Forest Service Gifford Pinchot to enact a series of conservation programs that often met with resistance from Western members of Congress, such as Charles William Fulton. Nonetheless, Roosevelt established the United States Forest Service, signed into law the creation of five National Parks, and signed the 1906 Antiquities Act, under which he proclaimed 18 new U.S. National Monuments. He also established the first 51 bird reserves, four game preserves, and 150 National Forests. In part due to his dedication to conservation, Roosevelt was voted in as the first honorary member of the Camp-Fire Club of America.

Roosevelt extensively used executive orders on a number of occasions to protect forest and wildlife lands during his tenure as president. By the end of his second term in office, Roosevelt used executive orders to establish  of reserved forestry land. Roosevelt was unapologetic about his extensive use of executive orders to protect the environment, despite the perception in Congress that he was encroaching on too many lands. Eventually, Senator Charles Fulton (R-OR) attached an amendment to an agricultural appropriations bill that effectively prevented the president from reserving any further land. Before signing that bill into law, Roosevelt used executive orders to establish an additional 21 forest reserves, waiting until the last minute to sign the bill into law. In total, Roosevelt used executive orders to establish 121 forest reserves in 31 states. Prior to Roosevelt, only one president had issued over 200 executive orders, Grover Cleveland (253). The first 25 presidents issued a total of 1,262 executive orders; Roosevelt issued 1,081.

Business panic of 1907

In 1907, Roosevelt faced the greatest domestic economic crisis since the Panic of 1893. Wall Street's stock market entered a slump in early 1907, and many investors blamed Roosevelt's regulatory policies for the decline in stock prices.  Roosevelt helped calm the crisis by meeting on November 4, 1907, with the leaders of U.S. Steel and approving their plan to purchase a Tennessee steel company near bankruptcy—its failure would ruin a major New York bank. He thus approved the growth of one of the largest and most hated trusts, while the public announcement calmed the markets.

Roosevelt exploded in anger at the super-rich for the economic malfeasance, calling them "malefactors of great wealth." in a major speech in August entitled, "The Puritan Spirit and the Regulation of Corporations." Trying to restore confidence, he blamed the crisis primarily on Europe, but then, after saluting the unbending rectitude of the Puritans, he went on: It may well be that the determination of the government...to punish certain malefactors of great wealth, has been responsible for something of the trouble; at least to the extent of having caused these men to combine to bring about as much financial stress as possible, in order to discredit the policy of the government and thereby secure a reversal of that policy, so that they may enjoy unmolested the fruits of their own evil-doing.

Regarding the very wealthy, Roosevelt privately scorned. "their entire unfitness to govern the country, and ... the lasting damage they do by much of what they think are the legitimate big business operations of the day."

Foreign policy

Japan 
The American annexation of Hawaii in 1898 was stimulated in part by fear that otherwise Japan would dominate or seize the Hawaiian Republic. Similarly, Germany was the alternative to American takeover of the Philippines in 1900, and Tokyo strongly preferred the U.S. to take over. As the U.S. became a naval world power, it needed to find a way to avoid a military confrontation in the Pacific with Japan.

In the 1890s, Roosevelt had been an ardent imperialist and vigorously defended the permanent acquisition of the Philippines in the 1900 campaign. After the local insurrection ended in 1902, Roosevelt wished to have a strong U.S. presence in the region as a symbol of democratic values, but he did not envision any new acquisitions. One of Roosevelt's priorities during his presidency and afterwards, was the maintenance of friendly relations with Japan. From 1904 to 1905 Japan and Russia were at war. Both sides asked Roosevelt to mediate a peace conference, held successfully in Portsmouth, New Hampshire. Roosevelt won the Nobel Peace Prize for his efforts.

Though he proclaimed that the United States would be neutral during the Russo-Japanese War, Roosevelt secretly favored the Imperial Japan to emerge victorious against the Russian Empire. He wanted the influence of the Russians to weaken in order to take them out in the Pacific diplomatic equation, with the Japanese emerging to their spot as the Russian replacement.

In California, anti-Japanese hostility was growing, and Tokyo protested. Roosevelt negotiated a "Gentleman's Agreement" in 1907. It ended explicit discrimination against the Japanese, and Japan agreed not to allow unskilled immigrants into the United States. The Great White Fleet of American battleships visited Japan in 1908 during its round-the-world tour.  Roosevelt intended to emphasize the superiority of the American fleet over the smaller Japanese navy, but instead of resentment the visitors arrived to a joyous welcome by Japanese elite as well as the general public.  This good-will facilitated the Root–Takahira Agreement of November 1908 which reaffirmed the status quo of Japanese control of Korea and American control of the Philippines.

Europe
Success in the war against Spain and the new empire, plus having the largest economy in the world, meant that the United States had emerged as a world power. Roosevelt searched for ways to win recognition for the position abroad.

Roosevelt also played a major role in mediating the First Moroccan Crisis by calling the Algeciras Conference, which averted war between France and Germany.

Roosevelt's presidency saw the strengthening of ties with Great Britain. The Great Rapprochement had begun with British support of the United States during the Spanish–American War, and it continued as Britain withdrew its fleet from the Caribbean in favor of focusing on the rising German naval threat. In 1901, Britain and the United States signed the Hay–Pauncefote Treaty, abrogating the Clayton–Bulwer Treaty, which had prevented the United States from constructing a canal connecting the Pacific and the Atlantic Ocean. The long-standing Alaska boundary dispute was settled on terms favorable to the United States, as Great Britain was unwilling to alienate the United States over what it considered to be a secondary issue. As Roosevelt later put it, the resolution of the Alaskan boundary dispute "settled the last serious trouble between the British Empire and ourselves."

Latin America and Panama Canal
As president, he primarily focused the nation's overseas ambitions on the Caribbean, especially locations that had a bearing on the defense of his pet project, the Panama Canal. Roosevelt also increased the size of the navy, and by the end of his second term the United States had more battleships than any other country besides Britain. The Panama Canal, when it opened in 1914, allowed the U.S. Navy to rapidly move back and forth from the Pacific to the Caribbean to European waters.

In December 1902, the Germans, British, and Italians blockaded the ports of Venezuela in order to force the repayment of delinquent loans. Roosevelt was particularly concerned with the motives of German Emperor Wilhelm II. He succeeded in getting the three nations to agree to arbitration by tribunal at The Hague, and successfully defused the crisis. The latitude granted to the Europeans by the arbiters was in part responsible for the "Roosevelt Corollary" to the Monroe Doctrine, which the President issued in 1904: "Chronic wrongdoing or an impotence which results in a general loosening of the ties of civilized society, may in America, as elsewhere, ultimately require intervention by some civilized nation, and in the Western Hemisphere, the adherence of the United States to the Monroe doctrine may force the United States, however reluctantly, in flagrant cases of such wrongdoing or impotence, to the exercise of an international police power."

The pursuit of an isthmus canal in Central America during this period focused on two possible routes—Nicaragua and Panama, which was then a rebellious district within Colombia. Roosevelt convinced Congress to approve the Panamanian alternative, and a treaty was approved, only to be rejected by the Colombian government. When the Panamanians learned of this, a rebellion followed, was supported by Roosevelt, and succeeded. A treaty with the new Panama government for construction of the canal was then reached in 1903. Roosevelt received criticism for paying the bankrupt Panama Canal Company and the New Panama Canal Company $40,000,000 (equivalent to $ billion in ) for the rights and equipment to build the canal. Critics charged that an American investor syndicate allegedly divided the large payment among themselves. There was also controversy over whether a French company engineer influenced Roosevelt in choosing the Panama route for the canal over the Nicaragua route. Roosevelt denied charges of corruption concerning the canal in a January 8, 1906, message to Congress. In January 1909, Roosevelt, in an unprecedented move, brought criminal libel charges against the New York World and the Indianapolis News known as the "Roosevelt-Panama Libel Cases". Both cases were dismissed by U.S. District Courts, and on January 3, 1911, the U.S. Supreme Court, upon federal appeal, upheld the lower courts' rulings. Historians are sharply critical of Roosevelt's criminal prosecutions of the World and the News, but are divided on whether actual corruption in acquiring and building the Panama Canal took place.

In 1906, following a disputed election, an insurrection ensued in Cuba; Roosevelt sent Taft, the Secretary of War, to monitor the situation; he was convinced that he had the authority to unilaterally authorize Taft to deploy Marines if necessary, without congressional approval.

Examining the work of numerous scholars, Ricard (2014) reports that:

The most striking evolution in the twenty-first-century historiography of Theodore Roosevelt is the switch from a partial arraignment of the imperialist to a quasi-unanimous celebration of the master diplomatist.... [Recent works] have underlined cogently Roosevelt's exceptional statesmanship in the construction of the nascent twentieth-century "special relationship". ...The twenty-sixth president's reputation as a brilliant diplomatist and real politician has undeniably reached new heights in the twenty-first century...yet, his Philippine policy still prompts criticism.

On November 6, 1906, Roosevelt was the first president to depart the continental United States on an official diplomatic trip. Roosevelt made a 17-day trip to Panama and Puerto Rico. Roosevelt checked on the progress of the Canal's construction and talked to workers about the importance of the project. In Puerto Rico, he recommended that Puerto Ricans become U.S. citizens.

Media

Building on McKinley's effective use of the press, Roosevelt made the White House the center of news every day, providing interviews and photo opportunities. After noticing the reporters huddled outside the White House in the rain one day, he gave them their own room inside, effectively inventing the presidential press briefing. The grateful press, with unprecedented access to the White House, rewarded Roosevelt with ample coverage.

Roosevelt normally enjoyed very close relationships with the press, which he used to keep in daily contact with his middle-class base. While out of office, he made a living as a writer and magazine editor. He loved talking with intellectuals, authors, and writers. He drew the line, however, at exposé-oriented scandal-mongering journalists who, during his term, sent magazine subscriptions soaring by their attacks on corrupt politicians, mayors, and corporations. Roosevelt himself was not usually a target, but a speech of his from 1906 coined the term "muckraker" for unscrupulous journalists making wild charges. "The liar", he said, "is no whit better than the thief, and if his mendacity takes the form of slander he may be worse than most thieves."

The press did briefly target Roosevelt in one instance. After 1904, he was periodically criticized for the manner in which he facilitated the construction of the Panama Canal. According to biographer Brands, Roosevelt, near the end of his term, demanded that the U.S. Justice Department bring charges of criminal libel against Joseph Pulitzer's New York World. The publication had accused him of "deliberate misstatements of fact" in defense of family members who were criticized as a result of the Panama affair. Though an indictment was obtained, the case was ultimately dismissed in federal court—it was not a federal offense, but one enforceable in state courts. The Justice Department had predicted that result, and had also advised Roosevelt accordingly.

Election of 1904

The control and management of the Republican Party lay in the hands of Ohio Senator and Republican Party chairman Mark Hanna until McKinley's death. Roosevelt and Hanna frequently cooperated during Roosevelt's first term, but Hanna left open the possibility of a challenge to Roosevelt for the 1904 Republican nomination. Roosevelt and Ohio's other Senator, Joseph B. Foraker, forced Hanna's hand by calling for Ohio's state Republican convention to endorse Roosevelt for the 1904 nomination. Unwilling to break with the president, Hanna was forced to publicly endorse Roosevelt. Hanna and Pennsylvania Senator Matthew Quay both died in early 1904, and with the waning of Thomas Platt's power, Roosevelt faced little effective opposition for the 1904 nomination. In deference to Hanna's conservative loyalists, Roosevelt at first offered the party chairmanship to Cornelius Bliss, but he declined. Roosevelt turned to his own man, George B. Cortelyou of New York, the first Secretary of Commerce and Labor. To buttress his hold on the party's nomination, Roosevelt made it clear that anyone opposing Cortelyou would be considered to be opposing the President. The President secured his own nomination, but his preferred vice-presidential running mate, Robert R. Hitt, was not nominated. Senator Charles Warren Fairbanks of Indiana, a favorite of conservatives, gained the nomination.

While Roosevelt followed the tradition of incumbents in not actively campaigning on the stump, he sought to control the campaign's message through specific instructions to Cortelyou. He also attempted to manage the press's release of White House statements by forming the Ananias Club. Any journalist who repeated a statement made by the president without approval was penalized by restriction of further access.

The Democratic Party's nominee in 1904 was Alton Brooks Parker. Democratic newspapers charged that Republicans were extorting large campaign contributions from corporations, putting ultimate responsibility on Roosevelt, himself. Roosevelt denied corruption while at the same time he ordered Cortelyou to return $100,000 (equivalent to $ million in ) of a campaign contribution from Standard Oil. Parker said that Roosevelt was accepting corporate donations to keep damaging information from the Bureau of Corporations from going public. Roosevelt strongly denied Parker's charge and responded that he would "go into the Presidency unhampered by any pledge, promise, or understanding of any kind, sort, or description...". Allegations from Parker and the Democrats, however, had little impact on the election, as Roosevelt promised to give every American a "square deal". Roosevelt won 56% of the popular vote, and Parker received 38%; Roosevelt also won the Electoral College vote, 336 to 140. Before his inauguration ceremony, Roosevelt declared that he would not serve another term. Democrats afterwards would continue to charge Roosevelt and the Republicans of being influenced by corporate donations during Roosevelt's second term.

Second term
As his second term progressed, Roosevelt moved to the left of his Republican Party base and called for a series of reforms, most of which Congress failed to pass. In his last year in office, he was assisted by his friend Archibald Butt (who later perished in the sinking of RMS Titanic). Roosevelt's influence waned as he approached the end of his second term, as his promise to forego a third term made him a lame duck and his concentration of power provoked a backlash from many Congressmen. He sought a national incorporation law (at a time when all corporations had state charters), called for a federal income tax (despite the Supreme Court's ruling in Pollock v. Farmers' Loan & Trust Co.), and an inheritance tax. In the area of labor legislation, Roosevelt called for limits on the use of court injunctions against labor unions during strikes; injunctions were a powerful weapon that mostly helped business. He wanted an employee liability law for industrial injuries (pre-empting state laws) and an eight-hour work day for federal employees. In other areas he also sought a postal savings system (to provide competition for local banks), and he asked for campaign reform laws.

The election of 1904 continued to be a source of contention between Republicans and Democrats. A Congressional investigation in 1905 revealed that corporate executives donated tens of thousands of dollars in 1904 to the Republican National Committee. In 1908, a month before the general presidential election, Governor Charles N. Haskell of Oklahoma, former Democratic Treasurer, said that Senators beholden to Standard Oil lobbied Roosevelt, in the summer of 1904, to authorize the leasing of Indian oil lands by Standard Oil subsidiaries. He said Roosevelt overruled his Secretary of the Interior Ethan A. Hitchcock and granted a pipeline franchise to run through the Osage lands to the Prairie Oil and Gas Company. The New York Sun made a similar accusation and said that Standard Oil, a refinery who financially benefited from the pipeline, had contributed $150,000 to the Republicans in 1904 (equivalent to $ million in ) after Roosevelt's alleged reversal allowing the pipeline franchise. Roosevelt branded Haskell's allegation as "a lie, pure and simple" and obtained a denial from Treasury Secretary Shaw that Roosevelt had neither coerced Shaw nor overruled him.

Rhetoric of righteousness
Roosevelt's rhetoric was characterized by an intense moralism of personal righteousness.  The tone was typified by his denunciation of "predatory wealth" in a message he sent Congress in January 1908 calling for passage of new labor laws: Predatory wealth--of the wealth accumulated on a giant scale by all forms of iniquity, ranging from the oppression of wageworkers to unfair and unwholesome methods of crushing out competition, and to defrauding the public by stock jobbing and the manipulation of securities. Certain wealthy men of this stamp, whose conduct should be abhorrent to every man of ordinarily decent conscience, and who commit the hideous wrong of teaching our young men that phenomenal business success must ordinarily be based on dishonesty, have during the last few months made it apparent that they have banded together to work for a reaction. Their endeavor is to overthrow and discredit all who honestly administer the law, to prevent any additional legislation which would check and restrain them, and to secure if possible a freedom from all restraint which will permit every unscrupulous wrongdoer to do what he wishes unchecked provided he has enough money....The methods by which the Standard Oil people and those engaged in the other combinations of which I have spoken above have achieved great fortunes can only be justified by the advocacy of a system of morality which would also justify every form of criminality on the part of a labor union, and every form of violence, corruption, and fraud, from murder to bribery and ballot box stuffing in politics.

Post-presidency (1909–1919)

Election of 1908

Roosevelt enjoyed being president and was still relatively youthful, but felt that a limited number of terms provided a check against dictatorship. Roosevelt ultimately decided to stick to his 1904 pledge not to run for a third term. He personally favored Secretary of State Elihu Root as his successor, but Root's ill health made him an unsuitable candidate. New York Governor Charles Evans Hughes loomed as a potentially strong candidate and shared Roosevelt's progressivism, but Roosevelt disliked him and considered him to be too independent. Instead, Roosevelt settled on his Secretary of War, William Howard Taft, who had ably served under Presidents Harrison, McKinley, and Roosevelt in various positions. Roosevelt and Taft had been friends since 1890, and Taft had consistently supported President Roosevelt's policies. Roosevelt was determined to install the successor of his choice, and wrote the following to Taft: "Dear Will: Do you want any action about those federal officials? I will break their necks with the utmost cheerfulness if you say the word!". Just weeks later he branded as "false and malicious" the charge that he was using the offices at his disposal to favor Taft. At the 1908 Republican convention, many chanted for "four years more" of a Roosevelt presidency, but Taft won the nomination after Henry Cabot Lodge made it clear that Roosevelt was not interested in a third term.

In the 1908 election, Taft easily defeated the Democratic nominee, three-time candidate William Jennings Bryan. Taft promoted a progressivism that stressed the rule of law; he preferred that judges rather than administrators or politicians make the basic decisions about fairness. Taft usually proved to be a less adroit politician than Roosevelt and lacked the energy and personal magnetism, along with the publicity devices, the dedicated supporters, and the broad base of public support that made Roosevelt so formidable. When Roosevelt realized that lowering the tariff would risk creating severe tensions inside the Republican Party by pitting producers (manufacturers, industrial workers, and farmers) against merchants and consumers, he stopped talking about the issue. Taft ignored the risks and tackled the tariff boldly, encouraging reformers to fight for lower rates, and then cutting deals with conservative leaders that kept overall rates high. The resulting Payne-Aldrich tariff of 1909, signed into law early in President Taft's tenure, was too high for most reformers, and Taft's handling of the tariff alienated all sides. While the crisis was building inside the Party, Roosevelt was touring Africa and Europe, to allow Taft space to be his own man.

Africa and Europe (1909–1910)

In March 1909, the ex-president left the country for the Smithsonian-Roosevelt African Expedition, a safari in east and central Africa. Roosevelt's party landed in Mombasa, East Africa (now Kenya) and traveled to the Belgian Congo (now Democratic Republic of the Congo) before following the Nile River to Khartoum in modern Sudan. Well-financed by Andrew Carnegie and by his own writings, Roosevelt's large party hunted for specimens for the Smithsonian Institution and for the American Museum of Natural History in New York. The group, led by the hunter-tracker R.J. Cunninghame, included scientists from the Smithsonian, and was joined from time to time by Frederick Selous, the famous big game hunter and explorer. Participants on the expedition included Kermit Roosevelt, Edgar Alexander Mearns, Edmund Heller, and John Alden Loring.

The team killed or trapped 11,400 animals, from insects and moles to hippopotamuses and elephants. The 1,000 large animals included 512 big game animals, including six rare white rhinos. Tons of salted carcases and skins were shipped to Washington; it took years to mount them all, and the Smithsonian shared duplicate specimens with other museums. Regarding the large number of animals taken, Roosevelt said, "I can be condemned only if the existence of the National Museum, the American Museum of Natural History, and all similar zoological institutions are to be condemned". He wrote a detailed account of the safari in the book African Game Trails, recounting the excitement of the chase, the people he met, and the flora and fauna he collected in the name of science.

After his safari, Roosevelt traveled north to embark on a tour of Europe. Stopping first in Egypt, he commented favorably on British rule of the region, giving his opinion that Egypt was not yet ready for independence. He refused a meeting with the Pope due to a dispute over a group of Methodists active in Rome. He met with Emperor Franz Joseph of Austria-Hungary, Kaiser Wilhelm II of Germany, King George V of Great Britain, and other European leaders. In Oslo, Norway, Roosevelt delivered a speech calling for limitations on naval armaments, a strengthening of the Permanent Court of Arbitration, and the creation of a "League of Peace" among the world powers. He also delivered the Romanes Lecture at Oxford, in which he denounced those who sought parallels between the evolution of animal life and the development of society. Though Roosevelt attempted to avoid domestic politics, he quietly met with Gifford Pinchot, who related his own disappointment with the Taft Administration. Pinchot had been forced to resign as head of the forest service after clashing with Taft's Interior Secretary, Richard Ballinger, who had prioritized development over conservation. Roosevelt returned to the United States in June 1910 where he was shortly thereafter honored with a reception luncheon on the roof of the Waldorf-Astoria Hotel in New York City hosted by the Camp-Fire Club of America, of which he was a member.

In October 1910, Roosevelt became the first U.S. president to fly in an airplane, staying aloft for four minutes in a Wright Brothers-designed craft near St. Louis.

Republican Party schism

Roosevelt had attempted to refashion Taft into a copy of himself, but he recoiled as Taft began to display his individuality. He was offended on election night when Taft indicated that his success had been possible not just through the efforts of Roosevelt, but also Taft's half-brother Charles. Roosevelt was further alienated when Taft, intent on becoming his own man, did not consult him about cabinet appointments. Roosevelt and other progressives were ideologically dissatisfied over Taft's conservation policies and his handling of the tariff when he concentrated more power in the hands of conservative party leaders in Congress. Stanley Solvick argues that as president Taft abided by the goals and procedures of the "Square Deal" promoted by Roosevelt in his first term.  The problem was that Roosevelt and the more radical progressives had moved on to more aggressive goals, such as curbing the judiciary, which Taft rejected. Regarding radicalism and liberalism, Roosevelt wrote a British friend in 1911:
Fundamentally it is the radical liberal with whom I sympathize. He is at least working toward the end for which I think we should all of us strive; and when he adds sanity in moderation to courage and enthusiasm for high ideals he develops into the kind of statesman whom alone I can wholeheartedly support.

Roosevelt urged progressives to take control of the Republican Party at the state and local level and to avoid splitting the party in a way that would hand the presidency to the Democrats in 1912. To that end Roosevelt publicly expressed optimism about the Taft Administration after meeting with the president in June 1910.

In August 1910, Roosevelt escalated the rivalry with a speech at Osawatomie, Kansas, which was the most radical of his career. It marked his public break with Taft and the conservative Republicans. Advocating a program he called the "New Nationalism", Roosevelt emphasized the priority of labor over capital interests, and the need to control corporate creation and combination. He called for a ban on corporate political contributions. Returning to New York, Roosevelt began a battle to take control of the state Republican party from William Barnes Jr., Tom Platt's successor as the state party boss. Taft had pledged his support to Roosevelt in this endeavor, and Roosevelt was outraged when Taft's support failed to materialize at the 1910 state convention. Roosevelt campaigned for the Republicans in the 1910 elections, in which the Democrats gained control of the House for the first time since 1892. Among the newly elected Democrats was New York state senator Franklin Delano Roosevelt, who argued that he represented his distant cousin's policies better than his Republican opponent.

The Republican progressives interpreted the 1910 defeats as a compelling argument for the complete reorganization of the party in 1911. Senator Robert M. La Follette of Wisconsin joined with Pinchot, William White, and California Governor Hiram Johnson to create the National Progressive Republican League; their objectives were to defeat the power of political bossism at the state level and to replace Taft at the national level. Despite his skepticism of La Follette's new league, Roosevelt expressed general support for progressive principles. Between January and April 1911, Roosevelt wrote a series of articles for The Outlook, defending what he called "the great movement of our day, the progressive nationalist movement against special privilege, and in favor of an honest and efficient political and industrial democracy". With Roosevelt apparently uninterested in running in 1912, La Follette declared his own candidacy in June 1911. Roosevelt continually criticized Taft after the 1910 elections, and the break between the two men became final after the Justice Department filed an antitrust lawsuit against US Steel in September 1911; Roosevelt was humiliated by this suit because he had personally approved of an acquisition that the Justice Department was now challenging. However, Roosevelt was still unwilling to run against Taft in 1912; he instead hoped to run in 1916 against whichever Democrat beat Taft in 1912.

Battling Taft over arbitration treaties
Taft was world leader for arbitration as a guarantee of world peace. In 1911 he and his Secretary of State Philander C. Knox negotiated major treaties with Great Britain and France providing that differences be arbitrated. Disputes had to be submitted to the Hague Court or other tribunal. These were signed in August 1911 but had to be ratified by a two-thirds vote of the Senate. Neither Taft or Knox consulted with leaders of the Senate during the negotiating process. By then many Republicans were opposed to Taft, and the president felt that lobbying too hard for the treaties might cause their defeat. He made some speeches supporting the treaties in October, but the Senate added amendments Taft could not accept, killing the agreements.

The arbitration issue revealed a deep philosophical dispute among American progressives. One faction, led by Taft looked to legal arbitration as the best alternative to warfare. Taft was a constitutional lawyer with a deep understanding of the legal issues. Taft's political base was the conservative business community that largely supported peace movements before 1914. However, he failed to mobilize that base. The businessmen believed that economic rivalries were the cause of war, and that extensive trade led to an interdependent world that would make war a very expensive and useless anachronism.

However, an opposing faction of progressives, led by Roosevelt, ridiculed arbitration as foolhardy idealism, and insisted on the realism of warfare as the only solution to serious international disputes. Roosevelt worked with his close friend Senator Henry Cabot Lodge to impose those amendments that ruined the goals of the treaties. Lodge's motivation was that he  complained the treaties impinged too much on senatorial prerogatives. Roosevelt, however, was acting to sabotage Taft's campaign promises. At a deeper level, Roosevelt truly believed that arbitration was a naïve solution and the great issues had to be decided by warfare. The Rooseveltian approach incorporated a near-mystical faith of the ennobling nature of war. It endorsed jingoistic nationalism as opposed to the businessmen's calculation of profit and national interest.

Election of 1912

Republican primaries and convention

In November 1911, a group of Ohio Republicans endorsed Roosevelt for the party's nomination for president; the endorsers included James R. Garfield and Dan Hanna. This endorsement was made by leaders of President Taft's home state. Roosevelt conspicuously declined to make a statement—requested by Garfield—that he would flatly refuse a nomination. Soon thereafter, Roosevelt said, "I am really sorry for Taft... I am sure he means well, but he means well feebly, and he does not know how! He is utterly unfit for leadership and this is a time when we need leadership." In January 1912, Roosevelt declared "if the people make a draft on me I shall not decline to serve". Later that year, Roosevelt spoke before the Constitutional Convention in Ohio, openly identifying as a progressive and endorsing progressive reforms—even endorsing popular review of state judicial decisions. In reaction to Roosevelt's proposals for popular overrule of court decisions, Taft said, "Such extremists are not progressives—they are political emotionalists or neurotics".

Roosevelt began to envision himself as the savior of the Republican Party from defeat in the upcoming presidential election. In February 1912, Roosevelt announced in Boston, "I will accept the nomination for president if it is tendered to me. I hope that so far as possible the people may be given the chance through direct primaries to express who shall be the nominee. Elihu Root and Henry Cabot Lodge thought that division of the party would lead to its defeat in the next election, while Taft believed that he would be defeated either in the Republican primary or in the general election.

The 1912 primaries represented the first extensive use of the presidential primary, a reform achievement of the progressive movement. The Republican primaries in the South, where party regulars dominated, went for Taft, as did results in New York, Indiana, Michigan, Kentucky, and Massachusetts. Meanwhile, Roosevelt won in Illinois, Minnesota, Nebraska, South Dakota, California, Maryland, and Pennsylvania. The greatest primary fight came in Ohio, Taft's base. Both the Taft and Roosevelt campaigns worked furiously, and La Follette joined in. Each team sent in big name speakers. Roosevelt's train went 1,800 miles back and forth in the one state, where he made 75 speeches. Taft's train went 3,000 miles criss-crossing Ohio and he made over 100 speeches.Roosevelt swept the state, convincing Roosevelt that he should intensify his campaigning, and letting Taft know he should work from the White House not the stump. Only a third of the states held primaries; elsewhere the state organization chose the delegations to the national convention and they favored Taft. The final credentials of the state delegates at the national convention were determined by the national committee, which was controlled by Taft men.
 
Prior to the 1912 Republican National Convention in Chicago, Roosevelt expressed doubt about his prospects for victory, noting that Taft had more delegates and control of the credentials committee. His only hope was to convince party leaders that the nomination of Taft would hand the election to the Democrats, but party leaders were determined not to cede their leadership to Roosevelt. The credentials committee awarded 235 contested delegates to Taft and 19 to Roosevelt. Taft won the nomination on the first ballot with 561 votes against 107 for Roosevelt and 41 for La Follette. Of the Roosevelt delegates, 344 refused to vote so they would not be committed to the Republican ticket. Black delegates from the South played a key role: they voted heavily for Taft and put him over the top. La Follette hoped that a deadlocked convention would result in his own nomination, and refused to release his delegates to support Roosevelt.

Roosevelt denounces the election
According to Lewis L. Gould, in 1912    Roosevelt saw Taft as the agent of "the forces of reaction and of political crookedness".... Roosevelt had become the most dangerous man in American history, said Taft, "because of his hold upon the less intelligent voters and the discontented."  The Republican National Committee, dominated by the Taft forces, awarded 235 delegates to the president and 19 to Roosevelt, thereby ensuring Taft's renomination. Roosevelt believed himself entitled to 72 delegates from Arizona, California, Texas and Washington that had been given to Taft. Firm in his conviction that the nomination was being stolen from him, Roosevelt ....told cheering supporters that there was "a great moral issue" at stake and he should have "sixty to eighty lawfully elected delegates" added to his total....Roosevelt ended his speech declaring: "Fearless of the future; unheeding of our individual fates; with unflinching hearts and undimmed eyes; we stand at Armageddon, and we battle for the Lord!"

The Progressive ("Bull Moose") Party

Once his defeat at the Republican convention appeared probable, Roosevelt announced that he would "accept the progressive nomination on a progressive platform and I shall fight to the end, win or lose". At the same time, Roosevelt prophetically said, "My feeling is that the Democrats will probably win if they nominate a progressive".

Roosevelt left the Republican Party and created the Progressive Party, structuring it as a permanent organization that would field complete tickets at the presidential and state level. The new party included many reformers, including Jane Addams. Although many Republican politicians had announced for Roosevelt before Taft won the nomination, he was stunned to discover that very few incumbent politicians followed him into the new party. The main exception was California, where the Progressive faction took control of the Republican Party. Loyalty to the old party was a powerful factor for incumbents; only five senators now supported Roosevelt. Roosevelt's daughter Alice had a White House marriage to Congressman Nicholas Longworth, who represented Taft's base in Cincinnati. Roosevelt reassured him in 1912 that of course he had to endorse Taft. However, Alice was her father's biggest cheerleader—the public conflict between spouses ruined the marriage.

The leadership of the new party included a wide range of reformers. Jane Addams campaigned vigorously for the new party as a breakthrough in social reform. Gifford Pinchot represented the environmentalists and anti-trust crusaders. Publisher Frank Munsey provided much of the cash. George W. Perkins, a leading Wall Street financier and senior partner of J.P. Morgan bank came from the efficiency movement. He handled the new party's finances efficiently, but was deeply distrusted by many reformers.

The new party was popularly known as the "Bull Moose Party" after Roosevelt told reporters, "I'm as fit as a bull moose". At the 1912 Progressive National Convention, Roosevelt cried out, "We stand at Armageddon and we battle for the Lord." Governor Hiram Johnson controlled the California party, forcing out the Taft supporters. He was nominated as Roosevelt's running mate.

Roosevelt's platform echoed his radical 1907–1908 proposals, calling for vigorous government intervention to protect the people from selfish interests:

Though many Progressive party activists in the North opposed the steady loss of civil rights for blacks, Roosevelt ran a "lily-white" campaign in the South. Rival all-white and all-black delegations from four southern states arrived at the Progressive national convention, and Roosevelt decided to seat the all-white delegations. Nevertheless, he won few votes outside a few traditional Republican strongholds. Out of 1,100 counties in the South, Roosevelt won two counties in Alabama, one in Arkansas, seven in North Carolina, three in Georgia, 17 in Tennessee, two in Texas, one in Virginia, and none in Florida, Louisiana, Mississippi, or South Carolina.

Assassination attempt

On October 14, 1912, while arriving at a campaign event in Milwaukee, Wisconsin, Roosevelt was shot from seven feet away in front of the Gilpatrick Hotel by a delusional saloonkeeper named John Flammang Schrank, who believed that the ghost of assassinated president William McKinley had directed him to kill Roosevelt. The bullet lodged in his chest after penetrating his steel eyeglass case and passing through a 50-page-thick single-folded copy of the speech titled "Progressive Cause Greater Than Any Individual", which he was carrying in his jacket. Schrank was immediately disarmed (by Czech immigrant Frank Bukovsky), captured, and might have been lynched had Roosevelt not shouted for Schrank to remain unharmed. Roosevelt assured the crowd he was all right, then ordered police to take charge of Schrank and to make sure no violence was done to him.

As an experienced hunter and anatomist, Roosevelt correctly concluded that since he was not coughing blood, the bullet had not reached his lung. He declined suggestions to go to the hospital immediately and instead delivered a 90 minute speech with blood seeping into his shirt. His opening comments to the gathered crowd were, "Ladies and gentlemen, I don't know whether you fully understand that I have just been shot, but it takes more than that to kill a Bull Moose." Only after finishing his address did he accept medical attention.

Subsequent probes and an x-ray showed that the bullet had lodged in Roosevelt's chest muscle, but did not penetrate the pleura. Doctors concluded that it would be less dangerous to leave it in place than to attempt to remove it, and Roosevelt carried the bullet with him for the rest of his life. Both Taft and Democratic nominee Woodrow Wilson suspended their own campaigning until Roosevelt recovered and resumed his. When asked if the shooting would affect his election campaign, he said to the reporter "I'm fit as a bull moose." The bull moose became a symbol of both Roosevelt and the Progressive Party, and it often was referred to as simply the Bull Moose Party. He spent two weeks recuperating before returning to the campaign trail. He later wrote a friend about the bullet inside him, "I do not mind it any more than if it were in my waistcoat pocket."

Democratic victory
After the Democrats nominated Governor Woodrow Wilson of New Jersey, Roosevelt did not expect to win the general election, as Wilson had compiled a record attractive to many progressive Democrats who might have otherwise considered voting for Roosevelt. Roosevelt still campaigned vigorously, and the election developed into a two-person contest despite Taft's quiet presence in the race. Roosevelt respected Wilson, but the two differed on various issues; Wilson opposed any federal intervention regarding women's suffrage or child labor (he viewed these as state issues), and attacked Roosevelt's tolerance of large businesses.

Roosevelt won 4.1 million votes (27%), compared to Taft's 3.5 million (23%) and Wilson's gained 6.3 million (42%). Wilson scored a massive landslide in the Electoral College, with 435 electoral votes; Roosevelt won 88 electoral votes, while Taft won 8. Pennsylvania was the only eastern state won by Roosevelt; in the Midwest, he carried Michigan, Minnesota, and South Dakota; in the West, California, and Washington. Wilson's victory was the first for a Democrat since Cleveland in 1892. It was the party's best performance in the Electoral College since 1852. Roosevelt, meanwhile, garnered a higher share of the popular vote than any other third-party presidential candidate in history and won the most states of any third-party candidate after the Civil War.

South American expedition (1913–1914)

In 1907 a friend of Roosevelt's, John Augustine Zahm, a professor at the University of Notre Dame, invited Roosevelt to help plan a research expedition to South America. Now was the time to escape politics. To finance it, Roosevelt obtained support from the American Museum of Natural History in return for promising to bring back many new animal specimens. Roosevelt's popular book, Through the Brazilian Wilderness describes his expedition into the Brazilian jungle in 1913 as a member of the Roosevelt-Rondon Scientific Expedition, co-named after its leader, Brazilian explorer Cândido Rondon.

Once in South America, a new, far more ambitious goal was added: to find the headwaters of the Rio da Duvida (Portuguese for "River of Doubt"), and trace it north to the Madeira and thence to the Amazon River. It was later renamed Roosevelt River in honor of the former president. Roosevelt's crew consisted of his son Kermit, Colonel Rondon, naturalist George Kruck Cherrie (sent by the American Museum of Natural History), Brazilian Lieutenant João Lira, team physician Dr. José Antonio Cajazeira, and 16 skilled paddlers and porters. Roosevelt also identified Leo Miller (another AMNH recommendation), Anthony Fiala, Frank Harper, and Jacob Sigg as crew members. The initial expedition started somewhat tenuously on December 9, 1913, at the height of the rainy season. The trip down the River of Doubt started on February 27, 1914.

During the trip down the river, Roosevelt suffered a minor leg wound after he jumped into the river to try to prevent two canoes from smashing against the rocks. The flesh wound he received, however, soon gave him tropical fever that resembled the malaria he had contracted while in Cuba fifteen years before. Because the bullet lodged in his chest from the assassination attempt in 1912 was never removed, his health worsened from the infection. This weakened Roosevelt so greatly that six weeks into the adventure, he had to be attended to day and night by the expedition's physician and his son Kermit. By then, he could not walk because of the infection in his injured leg and an infirmity in the other, which was due to a traffic accident a decade earlier. Regarding his condition as a threat to the survival of the others, Roosevelt insisted he be left behind to allow the poorly provisioned expedition to proceed as rapidly as it could, preparing to commit suicide with an overdose of morphine. Only an appeal by his son persuaded him to continue.

Upon Roosevelt's return to New York, friends and family were startled by his physical appearance and fatigue. Roosevelt wrote, perhaps prophetically, to a friend that the trip had cut his life short by ten years. For the rest of his few remaining years, he would be plagued by flare-ups of malaria and leg inflammations so severe as to require surgery. When he had recovered sufficiently, he addressed a standing-room-only convention organized in Washington, D.C., by the National Geographic Society and satisfactorily defended his claims.

Final years

Roosevelt returned to the United States in May 1914. Though he was outraged by the Wilson Administration's conclusion of a treaty that expressed "sincere regret" for the way in which the United States had acquired the Panama Canal Zone, he was impressed by many of the reforms passed under Wilson. Roosevelt made several campaign appearances for the Progressives, but the 1914 elections were a disaster for the fledgling third party. Roosevelt began to envision another campaign for president, this time with himself at the head of the Republican Party, but conservative party leaders remained opposed to Roosevelt. In hopes of engineering a joint nomination, the Progressives scheduled the 1916 Progressive National Convention at the same time as the 1916 Republican National Convention. When the Republicans nominated Charles Evans Hughes, Roosevelt declined the Progressive nomination and urged his Progressive followers to support the Republican candidate. Though Roosevelt had long disliked Hughes, he disliked Wilson even more, and he campaigned energetically for the Republican nominee. However, Wilson won the 1916 election by a narrow margin. The Progressives disappeared as a party following the 1916 election, and Roosevelt and many of his followers permanently re-joined the Republican Party.

World War I
When the First World War began in 1914, Roosevelt strongly supported the Allies and demanded a harsher policy against Germany, especially regarding submarine warfare. Roosevelt angrily denounced the foreign policy of President Wilson, calling it a failure regarding the atrocities in Belgium and the violations of American rights. In 1916, while campaigning for Hughes, Roosevelt repeatedly denounced Irish-Americans and German-Americans whom he described as unpatriotic, saying they put the interests of Ireland and Germany ahead of America's by supporting neutrality. He insisted that one had to be 100% American, not a "hyphenated American" who juggled multiple loyalties. In March 1917, Congress gave Roosevelt the authority to raise a maximum of four divisions similar to the Rough Riders, and Major Frederick Russell Burnham was put in charge of both the general organization and recruitment. However, President Wilson announced to the press that he would not send Roosevelt and his volunteers to France, but instead would send an American Expeditionary Force under the command of General John J. Pershing. Roosevelt never forgave Wilson, and quickly published The Foes of Our Own Household, an indictment of the sitting president. Roosevelt's youngest son, Quentin, a pilot with the American forces in France, was killed when shot down behind German lines on July 14, 1918, at the age of 20. It is said that Quentin's death distressed Roosevelt so much that he never recovered from his loss.

League of Nations

Roosevelt was an early supporter of the modern view that there needs to be a global order. In his Nobel prize address of 1910, he said, "it would be a master stroke if those great Powers honestly bent on peace would form a League of Peace, not only to keep the peace among themselves, but to prevent, by force if necessary, its being broken by others." It would have executive power such as the Hague Conventions of 1899 and 1907 lacked. He called for American participation.

When World War I broke out, Roosevelt proposed "a World League for the Peace of Righteousness", in September 1914, which would preserve sovereignty but limit armaments and require arbitration. He added that it should be "solemnly covenanted that if any nations refused to abide by the decisions of such a court, then others draw the sword in behalf of peace and justice." In 1915 he outlined this plan more specifically, urging that nations guarantee their entire military force, if necessary, against any nation that refused to carry out arbitration decrees or violated rights of other nations. Though Roosevelt had some concerns about the impact on United States sovereignty, he insisted that such a league would only work if the United States participated as one of the "joint guarantors". Roosevelt referred to this plan in a 1918 speech as "the most feasible for...a league of nations." By this time Wilson was strongly hostile to Roosevelt and Lodge, and developed his own plans for a rather different League of Nations. It became reality along Wilson's lines at the Paris Peace Conference in 1919. Roosevelt denounced Wilson's approach but died before it was adopted at Paris. However, Lodge was willing to accept it with serious reservations. In the end, on March 19, 1920, Wilson had Democratic Senators vote against the League with the Lodge Reservations and the United States never joined the League of Nations.

Final political activities
Roosevelt's attacks on Wilson helped the Republicans win control of Congress in the midterm elections of 1918. He declined a request from New York Republicans to run for another gubernatorial term, but attacked Wilson's Fourteen Points, calling instead for the unconditional surrender of Germany. Though his health was uncertain, he was seen as a leading contender for the 1920 Republican nomination, but insisted that, "If they take me, they'll have to take me without a single modification of the things that I have always stood for!  He wrote William Allen White, "I wish to do everything in my power to make the Republican Party the Party of sane, constructive radicalism, just as it was under Lincoln." Accordingly, he told the 1918 state convention of the Maine Republican Party that he stood for old-age pensions, insurance for sickness and unemployment, construction of public housing for low-income families, the reduction of working hours, aid to farmers, and more regulation of large corporations.

While his political profile remained high, Roosevelt's physical condition continued to deteriorate throughout 1918 due to the long-term effects of jungle diseases. He was hospitalized for seven weeks late in the year and never fully recovered.

Death

On the night of January 5, 1919, Roosevelt suffered breathing problems. After receiving treatment from his physician, Dr. George W. Faller, he felt better and went to bed. Roosevelt's last words were "Please put out that light, James" to his family servant James E. Amos. Between 4:00 and 4:15 the next morning, Roosevelt, at the age of 60, died in his sleep at Sagamore Hill after a blood clot detached from a vein and traveled to his lungs.

Upon receiving word of his death, his son Archibald telegraphed his siblings: "The old lion is dead." Woodrow Wilson's vice president, Thomas R. Marshall, said that "Death had to take Roosevelt sleeping, for if he had been awake, there would have been a fight." Following a private farewell service in the North Room at Sagamore Hill, a simple funeral was held at Christ Episcopal Church in Oyster Bay. Vice President Thomas R. Marshall, Charles Evans Hughes, Warren G. Harding, Henry Cabot Lodge, and William Howard Taft were among the mourners. The snow-covered procession route to Youngs Memorial Cemetery was lined with spectators and a squad of mounted policemen who had ridden from New York City. Roosevelt was buried on a hillside overlooking Oyster Bay.

Writer

Roosevelt was a prolific author, writing with passion on subjects ranging from foreign policy to the importance of the national park system. Roosevelt was also an avid reader of poetry. Poet Robert Frost said that Roosevelt "was our kind. He quoted poetry to me. He knew poetry."

As an editor of The Outlook, Roosevelt had weekly access to a large, educated national audience. In all, Roosevelt wrote about 18 books (each in several editions), including his autobiography, The Rough Riders, History of the Naval War of 1812, and others on subjects such as ranching, explorations, and wildlife. His most ambitious book was the four volume narrative The Winning of the West, focused on the American frontier in the 18th and early 19th centuries. Roosevelt said that the American character—indeed a new "American race" (ethnic group) had emerged from the heroic wilderness hunters and Indian fighters, acting on the frontier with little government help. Roosevelt also published an account of his 1909–10 African expedition entitled African Game Trails.

In 1907, Roosevelt became embroiled in a widely publicized literary debate known as the nature fakers controversy. A few years earlier, naturalist John Burroughs had published an article entitled "Real and Sham Natural History" in the Atlantic Monthly, attacking popular writers of the day such as Ernest Thompson Seton, Charles G. D. Roberts, and William J. Long for their fantastical representations of wildlife. Roosevelt agreed with Burroughs's criticisms, and published several essays of his own denouncing the booming genre of "naturalistic" animal stories as "yellow journalism of the woods". It was the President himself who popularized the negative term "nature faker" to describe writers who depicted their animal characters with excessive anthropomorphism.

Character and beliefs

Roosevelt intensely disliked being called "Teddy", despite the widespread public association with said moniker, and was quick to point out this to those who referred to him as such, though it would become widely used by newspapers during his political career.

He was an active Freemason and member of the Sons of the American Revolution.

British scholar Marcus Cunliffe evaluates the liberal argument that Roosevelt was an opportunist, exhibitionist, and imperialist. Cunliffe praises TR's versatility, his respect for law, and his sincerity. He argues that Roosevelt's foreign policy was better than his detractors allege. Cunliffe calls him "a big man in several respects," ranking him below Washington, Lincoln, and Jefferson, and on the same level as Franklin D. Roosevelt.

Strenuous life
Roosevelt had a lifelong interest in pursuing what he called, in an 1899 speech, "The Strenuous Life". To this end, he exercised regularly and took up boxing, tennis, hiking, rowing, polo, and horseback riding. He also continued his habit of skinny-dipping in the Potomac River during the winter. As governor of New York, he boxed with sparring partners several times each week, a practice he regularly continued as president until being hit so hard in the face he became blind in his left eye (a fact not made public until many years later). As president, he practiced judo for two 2-month periods in 1902 and 1904, not attaining any rank. Roosevelt began to believe in the utility of jiu-jitsu training after training with Yoshitsugu Yamashita. Concerned that the United States would lose its military supremacy to rising powers like Japan, Roosevelt began to advocate for jiu-jitsu training for American soldiers. Feminists annoyed by the posturing of men like Roosevelt, insisted that women were just as capable of learning jiu-jitsu. To prove their point, Martha Blow Wadsworth and Maria Louise ("Hallie") Davis Elkins hired Fude Yamashita, a highly skilled jiu-jitsu instructor and the wife of Yoshitsugu Yamashita, to teach a jiu-jitsu class for women and girls in Washington, DC in 1904. Women had already begun training in boxing in the United States as a means of personal and political empowerment. Jiu-jitsu training thus soon also became popular with American women, coinciding with the origins of a women's self-defense movement.

Roosevelt was an enthusiastic singlestick player and, according to Harper's Weekly, showed up at a White House reception with his arm bandaged after a bout with General Leonard Wood in 1905. Roosevelt was an avid reader, reading tens of thousands of books, at a rate of several per day in multiple languages. Along with Thomas Jefferson, Roosevelt was the most well-read of all American presidents.

Warrior

Historians have often emphasized Roosevelt's warrior persona. He took aggressive positions regarding war with Spain in 1898, Colombia in 1903, and especially with Germany, from 1915 to 1917. As a demonstration of American naval might, he sent the "Great White Fleet" around the world in 1907–1909. The implicit threat of the "big stick" of military power provided leverage to "speak softly" and quietly resolve conflict in numerous cases. He boasted in his autobiography:

Richard D. White Jr states, "Roosevelt's warrior spirit framed his views of national politics, [and] international relations."

Historian Howard K. Beale has argued:

Religion

Roosevelt attended church regularly and was a lifelong adherent of the Reformed Church in America, the American affiliate of the Dutch Reformed Church. He often praised moral behavior but apparently never made a spiritual confession of his own faith. After the 1885 death of his wife, he almost never mentioned Jesus Christ in public or private.  Dr. Benjamin J. Wetzel says, "There is little in Roosevelt suggestive of grace, mercy, or redemption."  His rejection of dogma and spirituality, says biographer William Harbaugh, led to a broad tolerance. He campaigned among Protestants, Catholics and Jews, and appointed them to office. He was suspicious of Mormons until they renounced polygamy.

In 1907, concerning the proposed motto "In God We Trust" on money, he wrote, "It seems to me eminently unwise to cheapen such a motto by use on coins, just as it would be to cheapen it by use on postage stamps, or in advertisements." Roosevelt talked a great deal about religion. Biographer Edmund Morris states:

Roosevelt publicly encouraged church attendance and was a conscientious churchgoer himself. When gas rationing was introduced during the First World War, he walked the three miles from his home at Sagamore Hill to the local church and back, even after a serious operation had made it difficult for him to travel by foot. It was said that Roosevelt "allowed no engagement to keep him from going to church," and he remained a fervent advocate of the Bible throughout his adult life. According to Christian F. Reisner, "Religion was as natural to Mr. Roosevelt as breathing," and when the travel library for Roosevelt's famous Smithsonian-sponsored African expedition was being assembled, the Bible was, according to his sister, "the first book selected." In an address delivered to the Long Island Bible Society in 1901, Roosevelt declared that:

Political positions

When he assumed the presidency, Roosevelt reassured many conservatives, stating that "the mechanism of modern business is so delicate that extreme care must be taken not to interfere with it in a spirit of rashness or ignorance." The following year, Roosevelt asserted the president's independence from business interests by opposing the merger which created the Northern Securities Company, and many were surprised that any president, much less an unelected one, would challenge powerful banker J.P. Morgan. In his last two years as president, Roosevelt became increasingly distrustful of big business, despite its close ties to the Republican Party. Roosevelt sought to replace the 19th-century laissez-faire economic environment with a new economic model which included a larger regulatory role for the federal government. He believed that 19th-century entrepreneurs had risked their fortunes on innovations and new businesses, and that these capitalists had been rightly rewarded. By contrast, he believed that 20th-century capitalists risked little but nonetheless reaped huge and, given the lack of risk, unjust, economic rewards. Without a redistribution of wealth away from the upper class, Roosevelt feared that the country would turn to radicals or fall to revolution. His Square Deal domestic program had three main goals: conservation of natural resources, control of corporations, and consumer protection. The Square Deal evolved into his program of "New Nationalism", which emphasized the priority of labor over capital interests and a need to more effectively control corporate creation and combination, and proposed a ban on corporate political contributions.

Foreign policy beliefs
In the analysis by Henry Kissinger, Roosevelt was the first president to develop the guideline that it was the duty of the United States to make its enormous power and potential influence felt globally. The idea of being a passive "city on the hill" model that others could look up to, he rejected. Roosevelt, trained in biology, was a social Darwinist who believed in survival of the fittest.  The international world in his view was a realm of violence and conflict. The United States had  all the economic and geographical potential to be the fittest nation on the globe.  The United States had a duty to act decisively. For example, in terms of the Monroe Doctrine, America had to prevent European incursions in the Western Hemisphere. But there was more, as he expressed in his famous Roosevelt Corollary to the Monroe Doctrine: the U.S. had to be the policeman of the region because unruly, corrupt smaller nations had to be controlled, and if United States did not do it, European powers would in fact intervene and develop their own base of power in the hemisphere in contravention to the Monroe Doctrine.

Roosevelt was a realist and a conservative. He deplored many of the increasingly popular idealistic liberal themes, such as were promoted by William Jennings Bryan, the anti-imperialists, and Woodrow Wilson. Kissinger says he rejected the efficacy of international law. Roosevelt argued that if a country could not protect its own interests, the international community could not help very much. He ridiculed disarmament proposals that were increasingly common. He saw no likelihood of an international power capable of checking wrongdoing on a major scale. As for world government: I regard the Wilson–Bryan attitude of trusting to fantastic peace treaties, too impossible promises, to all kinds of scraps of paper without any backing in efficient force, as abhorrent. It is infinitely better for a nation and for the world to have the Frederick the Great and Bismarck tradition as regards foreign policy than to have the Bryan or Bryan–Wilson attitude as a permanent national attitude.... A milk-and-water righteousness unbacked by force is...as wicked as and even more mischievous than force divorced from righteousness.

On his international outlook, Roosevelt favored spheres of influence, whereby one great power would generally prevail, such as the United States in the Western Hemisphere or Great Britain in the Indian subcontinent. Japan fit that role and he approved. However he had deep distrust of both Germany and Russia.

Legacy
Historians credit Roosevelt for changing the nation's political system by permanently placing the "bully pulpit" of the presidency at center stage and making character as important as the issues. His accomplishments include trust busting and conservationism. He is a hero to liberals and progressives for his proposals in 1907–1912 that presaged the modern welfare state of the New Deal Era, including direct federal taxation, labor reforms, and more direct democracy, while conservationists admire Roosevelt for putting the environment and selflessness towards future generations on the national agenda, and conservatives and nationalists respect his commitment to law and order, civic duty, and military values, as well as his personality of individual self-responsibility and hardiness. Dalton says, "Today he is heralded as the architect of the modern presidency, as a world leader who boldly reshaped the office to meet the needs of the new century and redefined America's place in the world."

Liberals and socialists have also criticized him for his interventionist and imperialist approach to nations he considered "uncivilized". Conservatives and libertarians reject his vision of the welfare state and emphasis on the superiority of government over private action. Historians typically rank Roosevelt among the top five presidents in American history.

Persona and masculinity

Dalton says Roosevelt is remembered as "one of the most picturesque personalities who has ever enlivened the landscape". His friend, historian Henry Adams, proclaimed: "Roosevelt, more than any other man... showed the singular primitive quality that belongs to ultimate matter—the quality that medieval theology assigned to God—he was pure act."

Roosevelt's biographers have stressed his personality. Henry F. Pringle, who won the Pulitzer Prize in biography for his Theodore Roosevelt (1931) stated: "The Theodore Roosevelt of later years was the most adolescent of men... Failure to receive the Medal of Honor for his exploits [in Cuba] had been a grief as real as any of those which swamp childhood in despair. 'You must always remember,' wrote Cecil Spring Rice in 1904, 'that the President is about six.'"

Cooper compared him with Woodrow Wilson and argued that both of them played the roles of warrior and priest. Dalton stressed Roosevelt's strenuous life. Sarah Watts examined the desires of the "Rough Rider in the White House". Brands calls Roosevelt "the last romantic", arguing that his romantic concept of life emerged from his belief that "physical bravery was the highest virtue and war the ultimate test of bravery".

Roosevelt as the exemplar of American masculinity has become a major theme. As president, he repeatedly warned men that they were becoming too office-bound, too complacent, too comfortable with physical ease and moral laxity, and were failing in their duties to propagate the race and exhibit masculine vigor. French historian Serge Ricard says, "the ebullient apostle of the Strenuous Life offers ideal material for a detailed psycho-historical analysis of aggressive manhood in the changing socio-cultural environment of his era; McKinley, Taft, or Wilson would perhaps inadequately serve that purpose". He promoted competitive sports like boxing and jiu-jitsu for physically strengthening American men. He also believed that organizations like the Boy Scouts of America, founded in 1910, could help mold and strengthen the character of American boys. Brands shows that heroic displays of bravery were essential to Roosevelt's image and mission:

Relations with Andrew Carnegie
According to David Nasaw, after 1898, when the United States entered a war with Spain, industrialist Andrew Carnegie increasingly devoted his energy to supporting pacifism.  He sold his steel company and now had the time and the dollars to make an impact.  Carnegie strongly opposed the war with Spain and the subsequent imperialistic American takeover of the Philippines. When Roosevelt became president in 1901, Carnegie and Roosevelt were in frequent contact.  They exchanged letters, communicated through mutual friends such as Secretary of State John Hay, and met in person. Carnegie offered a steady stream of advice on foreign policy, especially on arbitration. Carnegie hoped that Roosevelt would turn the Philippines free, not realizing he was more of an imperialist and believer in warrior virtues than President McKinley had been.  He saluted Roosevelt for forcing Germany and Britain to arbitrate their conflict with Venezuela in 1903, and especially for becoming the mediator who negotiated an end to the war between Russia and Japan in 1907–1908. Roosevelt relied on Carnegie for financing his expedition to Africa in 1909. In return he asked the ex-president to mediate the growing conflict between the two cousins who ruled Britain and Germany. Roosevelt started to do so but the scheme collapsed when king Edward VII suddenly died. Nasaw argues that Roosevelt systematically deceived and manipulated Carnegie, and held the elderly man in contempt. Nasaw quotes a private letter Roosevelt wrote to Whitelaw Reid in 1905: [I have] tried hard to like Carnegie, but it is pretty difficult. There is no type of man for whom I feel a more contemptuous abhorrence than for the one who makes a God of mere money-making and at the same time is always yelling out that kind of utterly stupid condemnation of war which in almost every case springs from a combination of defective physical courage, of unmanly shrinking from pain and effort, and of hopelessly twisted ideals. All the suffering from Spanish war comes far short of the suffering, preventable and non-preventable, among the operators of the Carnegie steel works, and among the small investors, during the time that Carnegie was making his fortune....It is as noxious folly to denounce war per se as it is to denounce business per se. Unrighteous war is a hideous evil; but I am not at all sure that it is worse evil than business unrighteousness.

Memorials and cultural depictions

Roosevelt was included with Presidents George Washington, Thomas Jefferson, and Abraham Lincoln at the Mount Rushmore Memorial, designed in 1927 with the approval of Republican President Calvin Coolidge.

For his gallantry at San Juan Hill, Roosevelt's commanders recommended him for the Medal of Honor. However, the initial recommendation lacked any eyewitnesses, and the effort was eventually tainted by Roosevelt's own lobbying of the War Department. In the late 1990s, Roosevelt's supporters again recommended the award, which was denied by the Secretary of the Army on basis that the decorations board determined "Roosevelt's bravery in battle did not rise to the level that would justify the Medal of Honor and, indeed, it did not rise to the level of men who fought in that engagement." Nevertheless, politicians apparently convinced the secretary to reconsider the award a third time and reverse himself, leading to the charge that it was a "politically motivated award." On January 16, 2001, President Bill Clinton awarded Theodore Roosevelt the Medal of Honor posthumously for his charge on San Juan Hill. He is the only president to have received the Medal of Honor.

On November 18, 1956, the United States Postal Service released a 6¢ Liberty Issue postage stamp honoring Roosevelt. A 32¢ stamp was issued on February 3, 1998, as part of the Celebrate the Century stamp sheet series. In 2008, Columbia Law School awarded Roosevelt a Juris Doctor degree, posthumously making him a member of the class of 1882.

Roosevelt's "Speak Softly and Carry a Big Stick" ideology is still quoted by politicians and columnists in different countries—not only in English, but also in translations to various other languages. Another lasting, popular legacy of Roosevelt is the stuffed toy bears—teddy bears—named after him following an incident on a hunting trip in Mississippi in 1902.

Roosevelt has been portrayed in films and television series such as Brighty of the Grand Canyon, The Wind and the Lion, Rough Riders, My Friend Flicka, and Law of the Plainsman. Robin Williams portrayed Roosevelt in the form of a wax mannequin that comes to life in Night at the Museum and its sequels Night at the Museum: Battle of the Smithsonian and Night at the Museum: Secret of the Tomb. In 2017, it was announced that Leonardo DiCaprio will portray Roosevelt in a biopic to be directed by Martin Scorsese. Additionally, Roosevelt appears as the leader of the American civilization in the 2016 Firaxis Games-developed video game Civilization VI.

Theodore Roosevelt National Park in the state of North Dakota is named after him. The America the Beautiful Quarters series features Roosevelt riding a horse on the national park's quarter.

Asteroid 188693 Roosevelt, discovered by astronomers with the Catalina Sky Survey in 2005, was named after him. The official  was published by the Minor Planet Center on November 8, 2019. Robert Peary named the Roosevelt Range and Roosevelt Land after him.

For eighty years, an equestrian statue of the former president, sitting above a Native American and an African American, stood in front of New York's American Museum of Natural History. In January 2022, after years of lobbying by activists, the statue was removed. Museum president Ellen V. Futter said the decision did not reflect a judgment about Roosevelt but was driven by the sculpture's "hierarchical composition".

Audiovisual media
 Theodore Roosevelt was one of the first presidents whose voice was recorded for posterity. Several of his recorded speeches survive. A 4.6-minute voice recording, which preserves Roosevelt's lower timbre ranges particularly well for its time, is among those available from the Michigan State University libraries (this is the 1912 recording of The Right of the People to Rule, recorded by Thomas Edison at Carnegie Hall). The audio clip sponsored by the Authentic History Center includes his defense of the Progressive Party in 1912, wherein he proclaims it the "party of the people" – in contrast with the other major parties.

 Roosevelt goes for a ride in Arch Hoxsey's plane in October 1910

See also

Notes

References

Print sources

Full biographies

 .
 
 .
 .
 , 105 pp, very short biography by leading scholar.
 .; also titled Power and responsibility; the life and times of Theodore Roosevelt online
 .
 .
 
 
 .
 
 , only volume published, to age 28.
 .
 .

Personality and activities

 .
 .
  Provides a lesson plan on TR as the historical figure who most exemplifies the quality of masculinity.
 . Chronicles the events of TR's presidency during the summers of his two terms.
 . The president's use of publicity, rhetoric and force of personality.
 ; his deadly 1913–14 trip to the Amazon.
 , best seller; to 1886.
 , to 1884.
 . 494 pp.
 
 , examines TR and his family during the World War I period.
 .
 , 240 pp. TR in Africa & Europe, 1909–10
 Wagenknecht, Edward. The seven worlds of Theodore Roosevelt (1958) The seven worlds are those of action, thought, human relations, family, spiritual values, public affairs, and war and peace. online
 . 289 pp.
 , 337 pp; TR's political thought and its significance for republican self-government.

Domestic policies

 online review; another online review 
 Cutright, P.R. (1985) Theodore Roosevelt: The making of a Modern Conservationist (U of Illinois Press.)
 .
 , standard history of his domestic and foreign policy as president. online
 .
 .
 Redekop, Benjamin. (2015). "Embodying the Story: The Conservation Leadership of Theodore Roosevelt". Leadership (2015) DOI:10.1177/1742715014546875 online
 .
 .

Politics

 . How TR did politics.
 , 323 pp.
 
 Cowan, Geoffrey. Let the People Rule: Theodore Roosevelt and the Birth of the Presidential Primary (WW Norton, 2016).
 Gable, John A. The Bull Moose Years (Kennikat Press Corp., 1978) 300pp on Roosevelt.
 .
 .
 .
 .
 
 . 361 pp.
 .
 . Focus on 1912; online free
 . online free
 . Attacks TR policies from conservative/libertarian perspective.

Foreign policy, military and naval issues

 . online
 .  excerpt  
 .
 . 328 pp.
 
 Kuehn, John T. "Theodore Roosevelt's Naval Diplomacy: The U.S. Navy and the Birth of the American Century," Naval War College Review (2010) 53#3 online 
 Livermore, Seward W. "Theodore Roosevelt, the American Navy, and the Venezuelan Crisis of 1902–1903." American Historical Review 51.3 (1946): 452–471. online 
 .
 .
 
 Nester, William R. Theodore Roosevelt and the Art of American Power: An American for All Time (Rowman & Littlefield, 2019). 
 Neu, Charles E. "Theodore Roosevelt and American Involvement in the Far East, 1901–1909." Pacific Historical Review 35.4 (1966): 433–449. online 
 O'Gara, Gordon Carpenter. Theodore Roosevelt and the Rise of the Modern Navy. (Princeton UP, 1943). online
 . 
 Oyos, Matthew M. In Command: Theodore Roosevelt and the American Military (2018) online review 
 Pietrusza, David (2018). TR's Last War: Theodore Roosevelt, the Great War, and a Journey of Triumph and Tragedy 
 .
 .
 .
 .
 Thompson, John M. Great Power Rising: Theodore Roosevelt and the Politics of US Foreign Policy (Oxford UP, 2019).
 
 . 196 pp.
 Turk, Richard W. The Ambiguous Relationship: Theodore Roosevelt and Alfred Thayer Mahan (1987) online review

Historiography and memory

 Bakari, Mohamed El-Kamel. "Mapping the 'Anthropocentric-ecocentric'Dualism in the History of American Presidency: The Good, the Bad, and the Ambivalent." Journal of Studies in Social Sciences 14, no. 2 (2016).
  Cullinane, M. Patrick, ed. Remembering Theodore Roosevelt: Reminiscences of his Contemporaries (2021) excerpt
  Cullinane, M. Patrick. “The Memory of Theodore Roosevelt through Motion Pictures” in A Companion to Theodore Roosevelt, ed. Serge Ricard (Wiley Blackwell, 2011), 502-520.
 
 Cunliffe, Marcus. "Theodore Roosevelt, President of the United States 1901–1908" History Today (Sept 1955) 4#9 pp. 592–601, online. 
 
 Gable, John. “The Man in the Arena of History: The Historiography of Theodore Roosevelt” in Theodore Roosevelt: Many-Sided American, eds. Natalie Naylor, Douglas Brinkley and John Gable (Interlaken, NY: Hearts of the Lakes, 1992), 613–643.
 
 Hull, Katy. "Hero, Champion of Social Justice, Benign Friend: Theodore Roosevelt in American Memory." European journal of American studies 13.13-2 (2018). online
 Ricard, Serge. "The State of Theodore Roosevelt Studies" H-Diplo Essay No. 116 24 October 2014 online 
 , excerpt and text search, 28 new essays by scholars; focus on historiography.

Unpublished PhD dissertations
These are available online at academic libraries.

 Bartley, Shirley. "The Man In The Arena: A Rhetorical Analysis Of Theodore Roosevelt'S Inventional Stance, 1910-1912" (Temple University ProQuest Dissertations Publishing,  1984. 8410181.
 Collin, Richard H. "The Image Of Theodore Roosevelt In American History And Thought, 1885-1965"  (New York University Proquest Dissertations Publishing,  1966. 7001489).
 Faltyn, Timothy W. "An active-positive leader: Applying James Barber to Theodore Roosevelt's life" (Oklahoma State University ProQuest Dissertations Publishing,  1999. 9942434).
 Gable, John Allen. "The Bull Moose Years: Theodore Roosevelt And The Progressive Party, 1912-1916. (Volumes I And Ii)" (Brown University Proquest Dissertations Publishing,  1972. 7302265).
 Heth, Jennifer Dawn. "Imagining TR: Commemorations and representations of Theodore Roosevelt in twentieth-century America" (Texas A&M University ProQuest Dissertations Publishing, 2014. 3717739)
 Levine, Stephen Lee. "Race, culture, and art: Theodore Roosevelt and the nationalist aesthetic" (Kent State University ProQuest Dissertations Publishing, 2001. 3034424).
 Mellor, Nathan B. "The leader as mediator: Theodore Roosevelt at Portsmouth—Ronald Reagan at Reykjavik" (Pepperdine University, ProQuest Dissertations Publishing, 2007. 3296771).
 Moore, A. Gregory. "The Dilemma Of Stereotypes: Theodore Roosevelt And China, 1901-1909" (Kent State University; ProQuest Dissertations Publishing, 1978. 7904808).
 Reed, Marvin Elijah, Jr.  "Theodore Roosevelt: The Search For Community In The Urban Age" (Tulane University, Graduate Program In Biomedical Sciences Proquest Dissertations Publishing, 1971. 7214199).
 Reter, Ronald Francis. "The Real Versus The Rhetorical Theodore Roosevelt In Foreign Policy-Making" (University Of Georgia Proquest Dissertations Publishing, 1973. 7331949).

Primary sources

 Auchincloss, Louis, ed. Theodore Roosevelt: Letters and Speeches (2004) 
 Brands, H. W. The selected letters of Theodore Roosevelt (2001) online
 O'Toole, Patricia ed. In the Words of Theodore Roosevelt : Quotations from the Man in the Arena (Cornell University Press, 2012)
 Hart, Albert Bushnell, and Herbert Ronald Ferleger, Theodore Roosevelt Cyclopedia (1941) online, short excerpts.
 Morison, Elting E. ed. The letters of Theodore Roosevelt (8 vol Harvard UP, 1951-1954); vol 7 online covers 1909-1912
The Complete Works of Theodore Roosevelt  (2017) 4500 pages in Kindle format   online for $1 at Amazon
 Kohn, Edward P., ed. A Most Glorious Ride: The Diaries of Theodore Roosevelt, 1877–1886 (State University of New York Press, 2015), 284 pp.
 ; vol 2 
 
 
 .
 
 
 , 20 vol.; 18,000 pages containing most of TR's speeches, books and essays, but not his letters.
 , Roosevelt's opinions on many issues; online version at Theodore Roosevelt .
 , 8 vols. Very large collection. vol 1 1868–1898 online
 . online
 
 .
  online
 .
 .

External links

Organizations
 Boone and Crockett Club
 Theodore Roosevelt Association

Libraries and collections
 Theodore Roosevelt Center at Dickinson State University
 Theodore Roosevelt Collection, at the Houghton Library, Harvard University
 Julian L. Street Papers on Theodore Roosevelt, at the Seeley G. Mudd Manuscript Library, Princeton University
 Doris A. and Lawrence H. Budner Collection on Theodore Roosevelt at the DeGolyer Library, Southern Methodist University
 Theodore Roosevelt's journalism at The Archive of American Journalism
 Theodore Roosevelt American Museum of Natural History
 
 
 
 
 Roosevelt Papers, at the Library of Congress
Guide to the Herbert R. Strauss Collection of Theodore Roosevelt Papers 1884–1919 at the University of Chicago Special Collections Research Center

Media

 Theodore Roosevelt Speech Edison Recordings Campaign -  1912, audio recording
 
 "Life Portrait of Theodore Roosevelt", from C-SPAN's American Presidents: Life Portraits, September 3, 1999
 "Writings of Theodore Roosevelt" from C-SPAN's American Writers: A Journey Through History

Other

 Almanac of Theodore Roosevelt
 Theodore Roosevelt: A Resource Guide – Library of Congress
 
 

 
1858 births
1900 United States vice-presidential candidates
1900s in the United States
1919 deaths
19th-century American politicians
19th-century American historians
19th-century American male writers
20th-century American male writers
20th-century American non-fiction writers
20th-century presidents of the United States
20th-century vice presidents of the United States
American autobiographers
American conservationists
American diarists
American essayists
American explorers
American fishers
American Freemasons
American hunters
American male judoka
American male non-fiction writers
American military personnel of the Spanish–American War
American nationalists
American naval historians
American Nobel laureates
American political party founders
American political writers
American shooting survivors
Aphorists
Articles containing video clips
American bibliophiles
American people of Dutch descent
Bulloch family
Burials in New York (state)
Candidates in the 1904 United States presidential election
Candidates in the 1912 United States presidential election
Candidates in the 1916 United States presidential election
Deaths from pulmonary embolism
English-language spelling reform advocates
Explorers of Amazonia
Governors of New York (state)
Hall of Fame for Great Americans inductees
Harvard Advocate alumni
Harvard College alumni
Members of the American Academy of Arts and Letters
Members of the American Philosophical Society
Military personnel from New York City
New York City Police Commissioners
New York (state) Progressives (1912)
Nobel Peace Prize laureates
People associated with the American Museum of Natural History
People from Oyster Bay (town), New York
Politicians from New York City
Presidents of the American Historical Association
Presidents of the United States
Progressive Era in the United States
Ranchers from North Dakota
Republican Party governors of New York (state)
Republican Party members of the New York State Assembly
Republican Party presidents of the United States
Republican Party (United States) presidential nominees
Republican Party (United States) vice presidential nominees
Republican Party vice presidents of the United States
Theodore
Rough Riders
Schuyler family
Sons of the American Revolution
Spanish–American War recipients of the Medal of Honor
United States Army Medal of Honor recipients
United States Army officers
United States Assistant Secretaries of the Navy
Vice presidents of the United States
Writers from New York (state)
Liberalism in the United States
Progressivism in the United States